This is a list of the fish species found in India and is based on FishBase.

Albuliformes

Albulidae (Bonefishes)
 Albula vulpes (native) Roundjaw bonefish, bonefish

Anguilliformes

Anguillidae (Freshwater eels)
 Anguilla bengalensis bengalensis (native) Indian longfin eel, Indian mottled eel
 Anguilla bicolor bicolor (native) Shortfin eel, Indonesian shortfin eel

Colocongridae 
 Coloconger raniceps (native), Froghead eel

Congridae (Conger and garden eels)
 Ariosoma Bathyuroconger vicinus (native) Large-toothed conger
 Conger cinereus (native) Longfin African conger
 Gorgasia maculata (native) Whitespotted garden eel
 Heteroconger hassi (native) Spotted garden eel
 Heteroconger obscurus (native)
 Promyllantor purpureus (native)
 Uroconger lepturus (native) Slender conger
 Xenomystax trucidans (native)

Moringuidae (Worm or spaghetti eels)
 Moringua abbreviata (native)
 Moringua arundinacea (native) Bengal spaghetti-eel
 Moringua bicolor (native)
 Moringua javanica (native) Java spaghetti eel
 Moringua microchir (native) Lesser thrush eel
 Moringua raitaborua (native) Purple spaghetti-eel

Muraenesocidae (Pike congers)
 Congresox talabon (native) Yellow pike conger
 Congresox talabonoides (native) Indian pike conger
 Muraenesox bagio (native) Common pike conger, pike eel
 Muraenesox cinereus (native) Dagger-tooth pike conger

Muraenidae (Moray eels)
 Anarchias allardicei (native) Allardice's moray
 Anarchias cantonensis (native) Canton Island moray
 Echidna delicatula (native) Mottled moray
 Echidna leucotaenia (native) Whiteface moray
 Echidna nebulosa (native) Snowflake moray
 Echidna polyzona (native) Barred moray
 Enchelynassa canina (native) Viper moray
 Gymnomuraena zebra (native) Zebra moray
 Gymnothorax afer (questionable) Dark moray
 Gymnothorax buroensis (native) Vagrant moray
 Gymnothorax enigmaticus (native) Enigmatic moray
 Gymnothorax favagineus (native) Laced moray
 Gymnothorax fimbriatus (native) Fimbriated moray
 Gymnothorax flavimarginatus (native) Yellow-edged moray
 Gymnothorax hepaticus (native) Liver-colored moray eel
 Gymnothorax javanicus (native) Giant moray
 Gymnothorax meleagris (native) Turkey moray
 Gymnothorax monochrous (native) Drab moray
 Gymnothorax monostigma (native) One-spot moray
 Gymnothorax pictus (native) Peppered moray
 Gymnothorax pseudothyrsoideus (native) Highfin moray
 Gymnothorax punctatofasciatus (native) Bars'n spots moray
 Gymnothorax punctatus (native) Red Sea whitespotted moray
 Gymnothorax randalli (questionable)
 Gymnothorax reticularis (native)
 Gymnothorax richardsonii (native) Richardson's moray
 Gymnothorax rueppelliae (native) Banded moray
 Gymnothorax thyrsoideus (native) Greyface moray
 Gymnothorax tile (native) Freshwater moray
 Gymnothorax undulatus (native) Undulated moray
 Scuticaria tigrina (native) Tiger reef-eel
 Strophidon sathete (native) Gangetic moray, Slender giant moray
 Uropterygius concolor (native) Unicolor snake moray
 Uropterygius macrocephalus (native) Needle-tooth moray
 Uropterygius marmoratus (native) Marbled reef-eel

Nemichthyidae (Snipe eels)
 Nemichthys scolopaceus (native) Slender snipe-eel

Nettastomatidae (Duckbill eels)
 Nettenchelys taylori (native)

Ophichthidae (Snake eels)
 Bascanichthys deraniyagalai (native) Indian longtailed sand-eel, Indian longtailed sand-eel
 Bascanichthys longipinnis (native)
 Caecula pterygera (native) Finny snake-eel, Finny snake eel
 Callechelys catostoma (native) Black-striped snake eel
 Lamnostoma orientalis (native) Oriental worm-eel, Oriental sand-eel
 Lamnostoma polyophthalma (native) Ocellated sand-eel
 Leiuranus semicinctus (native) Saddled snake eel
 Muraenichthys gymnopterus (questionable)
 Muraenichthys schultzei (native) Maimed snake eel
 Myrichthys colubrinus (native) Harlequin snake eel
 Neenchelys buitendijki (native) Fintail serpent eel
 Ophichthus altipennis (native) Highfin snake eel
 Ophichthus apicalis (native) Bluntnose snake-eel
 Ophichthus cephalozona (native) Dark-shouldered snake eel
 Ophichthus regius (questionable) Ornate snake eel
 Pisodonophis boro (native) Rice-paddy eel
 Pisodonophis cancrivorus (native) Longfin snake-eel
 Scolecenchelys macroptera (native) Slender snake eel
 Skythrenchelys zabra (native) Angry worm eel
 Xestochilus nebulosus (native) Nebulous snake eel

Atheriniformes

Atherinidae (Silversides)
 Atherinomorus duodecimalis (native) Tropical silverside
 Atherinomorus lacunosus (native) Hardyhead silverside
 Atherion africanus (native) Pricklenose silverside
 Hypoatherina barnesi (native) Barnes' silverside
 Hypoatherina temminckii (native) Samoan silverside
 Hypoatherina valenciennei (native) Sumatran silverside

Notocheiridae (Surf sardines)
 Iso natalensis (native) Surf sprite

Aulopiformes

Alepisauridae (Lancetfishes)
 Alepisaurus ferox (questionable) Longnose lancetfish

Chlorophthalmidae (Greeneyes)
 Chlorophthalmus agassizi (native) Shortnose greeneye
 Chlorophthalmus bicornis (native) Spinyjaw greeneye

Ipnopidae 
 Bathypterois atricolor (native) Attenuated spider fish
 Bathypterois guentheri (native)
 Bathypterois insularum (native)

Synodontidae (Lizardfishes)
 Harpadon nehereus (native) Bombay duck, bummalo
 Harpadon squamosus (native)
 Harpadon translucens (native), Glassy Bombay duck
 Saurida gracilis (native) Gracile lizardfish
 Saurida isarankurai (questionable) Shortjaw saury
 Saurida longimanus (native) Longfin lizardfish
 Saurida micropectoralis (native) Shortfin lizardfish
 Saurida nebulosa (native) Clouded lizardfish
 Saurida pseudotumbil (native)
 Saurida tumbil (native) Greater lizardfish
 Saurida undosquamis (native) Brushtooth lizardfish
 Saurida wanieso (native) Wanieso lizardfish
 Synodus binotatus (native) Two-spot lizard fish
 Synodus englemani (native) Engleman's lizardfish
 Synodus gibbsi (native)
 Synodus indicus (native) Indian lizardfish
 Synodus jaculum (native) Lighthouse lizardfish
 Synodus macrocephalus (native)
 Synodus macrops (native) Triplecross lizardfish
 Synodus oculeus (native)
 Synodus sageneus (native) Speartoothed grinner
 Synodus variegatus (native) Variegated lizardfish
 Trachinocephalus myops (native) Snakefish

Batrachoidiformes

Batrachoididae (Toadfishes)
 Allenbatrachus grunniens (native) Frog fish, Grunting toadfish
 Austrobatrachus dussumieri (native) Flat toadfish

Beloniformes

Adrianichthyidae (Ricefishes)
 Horaichthys setnai (endemic) Thready top-minnow, Malabar ricefish
 Oryzias carnaticus (native)
 Oryzias dancena (native)

Belonidae (Needlefishes)
 Ablennes hians (native) Flat needlefish
 Platybelone argalus platyura (native) Keeled needlefish
 Strongylura incisa (native) Reef needlefish
 Strongylura leiura (native) Banded needlefish
 Strongylura strongylura (native) Spottail needlefish
 Tylosurus acus melanotus (native) Keel-jawed needle fish
 Tylosurus choram (questionable) Red Sea houndfish
 Tylosurus crocodilus (native) Houndfish, Crocodile needlefish
 Xenentodon cancila (native) Freshwater garfish

Exocoetidae (Flyingfishes)
 Cheilopogon abei (native)
 Cheilopogon cyanopterus (native) Margined flyingfish
 Cheilopogon exsiliens (questionable) Bandwing flyingfish
 Cheilopogon furcatus (native) Spotfin flyingfish
 Cheilopogon intermedius (native)
 Cheilopogon nigricans (native) African flyingfish
 Cheilopogon spilopterus (native) Manyspotted flyingfish
 Cheilopogon suttoni (native) Sutton's flyingfish
 Cypselurus naresii (native) Pharao flyingfish
 Cypselurus oligolepis (native) Largescale flyingfish
 Exocoetus monocirrhus (native) Barbel flyingfish
 Exocoetus volitans (native) Tropical two-wing flyingfish
 Hirundichthys coromandelensis (native) Coromandel flyingfish
 Hirundichthys oxycephalus (native) Bony flyingfish
 Hirundichthys speculiger (native) Mirrorwing flyingfish
 Parexocoetus brachypterus (native) Sailfin flyingfish
 Parexocoetus mento (native) African sailfin flyingfish
 Prognichthys brevipinnis (native) Shortfin flyingfish

Hemiramphidae (Halfbeaks)
 Dermogenys brachynotopterus (native) Gangetic halfbeak
 Dermogenys pusilla (native) Freshwater halfbeak, Wrestling halfbeak
 Euleptorhamphus viridis (native) Ribbon halfbeak
 Hemiramphus archipelagicus (native) Jumping halfbeak
 Hemiramphus far (native) Blackbarred halfbeak
 Hemiramphus lutkei (native) Lutke's halfbeak
 Hyporhamphus affinis (native) Tropical halfbeak
 Hyporhamphus balinensis (native) Balinese garfish
 Hyporhamphus dussumieri (native) Dussumier's halfbeak
 Hyporhamphus limbatus (native) Congaturi halfbeak, Congaturi halfbeak
 Hyporhamphus quoyi (native) Quoy's garfish
 Hyporhamphus sindensis (native) Sind halfbeak
 Hyporhamphus unicuspis (native) Simpletooth halfbeak
 Hyporhamphus unifasciatus (questionable) Common halfbeak
 Hyporhamphus xanthopterus (endemic) Red-tipped halfbeak
 Oxyporhamphus micropterus micropterus (native) Bigwing halfbeak
 Rhynchorhamphus georgii (native) Long billed half beak
 Rhynchorhamphus malabaricus (native) Malabar halfbeak
 Zenarchopterus buffonis (native) Buffon's river-garfish
 Zenarchopterus dispar (native) Viviparous half beak, Feathered river-garfish
 Zenarchopterus ectuntio (native) Ectuntio halfbeak
 Zenarchopterus gilli (native) Viviparous halfbeak
 Zenarchopterus pappenheimi (native) Bangkok halfbeak
 Zenarchopterus striga (native) Hooghly halfbeak

Beryciformes

Berycidae (Alfonsinos)
 Beryx decadactylus (native) Alfonsino
 Beryx splendens (native) Splendid alfonsino
 Centroberyx spinosus (questionable) Short alfonsino

Holocentridae (Squirrelfishes, soldierfishes)
 Myripristis adusta (native) Shadowfin soldierfish
 Myripristis botche (native) Blacktip soldierfish
 Myripristis hexagona (native) Doubletooth soldierfish
 Myripristis murdjan (native) Pinecone soldierfish
 Neoniphon argenteus (native) Clearfin squirrelfish
 Neoniphon opercularis (native) Blackfin squirrelfish
 Neoniphon sammara (native) Sammara squirrelfish
 Ostichthys acanthorhinus (native) Spinysnout soldierfish
 Ostichthys japonicus (native) Brocade perch
 Sargocentron caudimaculatum (native) Silverspot squirrelfish
 Adioryx diadema (native), Crown squirrelfish
 Sargocentron ittodai (native) Samurai squirrelfish
 Sargocentron microstoma (native) Smallmouth squirrelfish
 Sargocentron praslin (native) Dark-striped squirrelfish
 Sargocentron punctatissimum (native) Speckled squirrelfish
 Sargocentron rubrum (native) Redcoat
 Sargocentron spiniferum (native) Sabre squirrelfish
 Sargocentron violaceum (native) Violet squirrelfish

Monocentridae (Pinecone fishes)
 Monocentris japonica (native) Japanese pinecone fish

Trachichthyidae (Slimeheads)
 Hoplostethus mediterraneus mediterraneus (native), Mediterranean slimehead

Carcharhiniformes

Carcharhinidae (Requiem sharks)

 Carcharhinus altimus (native), Bignose shark
 Carcharhinus amblyrhynchoides (native) Graceful shark
 Carcharhinus amboinensis (native) Pigeye shark
 Carcharhinus brevipinna (native) Spinner shark
 Carcharhinus dussumieri (native) Whitecheek shark, Widemouth blackspot shark
 Carcharhinus falciformis (native) Blackspot shark, Silky shark
 Carcharhinus hemiodon (native) Pondicherry shark, Pondicherry shark
 Carcharhinus leucas (native) Bull shark
 Carcharhinus limbatus (native) Blacktip shark
 Carcharhinus longimanus (native) Oceanic whitetip shark
 Carcharhinus macloti (native) Maclot's shark, Hardnose shark
 Carcharhinus melanopterus (native) Blacktip reef shark
 Carcharhinus sealei (native) Blackspot shark
 Carcharhinus sorrah (native) Sorrah, Spottail shark
 Galeocerdo cuvier (native) Tiger shark
 Glyphis gangeticus (native) Ganges shark
 Lamiopsis temminckii (native) Broadfin shark
 Loxodon macrorhinus (native) Sliteye shark
 Negaprion acutidens (native) Sicklefin lemon shark
 Prionace glauca (native) Blue shark
 Rhizoprionodon acutus (native) Eidah, Milk shark
 Rhizoprionodon oligolinx (native) Grey dog shark, Grey sharpnose shark
 Scoliodon laticaudus (native) Spadenose shark
 Triaenodon obesus (native) Whitetip reef shark

Hemigaleidae (Weasel sharks)
 Chaenogaleus macrostoma (native) Hooktooth shark
 Hemigaleus microstoma (native) Sicklefin weasel shark
 Hemipristis elongata (native) Elliot's grey shark, Snaggletooth shark

Proscylliidae (Finback catsharks)
 Eridacnis radcliffei (native) Pygmy ribbontail catshark

Scyliorhinidae (Cat sharks)
 Apristurus investigatoris (native) Broadnose catshark
 Atelomycterus marmoratus (native) Marbled cat shark, Coral catshark
 Cephaloscyllium silasi (native) Indian swellshark
 Halaelurus buergeri (questionable) Blackspotted catshark
 Halaelurus hispidus (native) Bristly catshark
 Halaelurus quagga (native) Quagga catshark
 Scyliorhinus capensis (questionable) Yellowspotted catshark

Sphyrnidae (Hammerhead sharks)
 Eusphyra blochii (native) Winghead shark
 Sphyrna lewini (native) Scalloped hammerhead
 Sphyrna mokarran (native) Great hammerhead
 Sphyrna tudes (questionable) Smalleye hammerhead
 Sphyrna zygaena (native) Round-headed hammerhead, Smooth hammerhead

Triakidae (Houndsharks)
 Iago omanensis (native) Bigeye houndshark
 Mustelus mosis (native) Arabian smooth-hound

Clupeiformes

Chirocentridae (Wolf herring)
 Chirocentrus dorab (native) Dorab wolf-herring
 Chirocentrus nudus (native) Whitefin wolf-herring

Clupeidae (Herring, shads, sardines, and menhadens)
 Amblygaster clupeoides (native) Bleeker smoothbelly sardinella
 Amblygaster leiogaster (native) Smooth-belly sardinella
 Amblygaster sirm (native) Spotted sardinella
 Anodontostoma chacunda (native) Chacunda gizzard shad
 Anodontostoma selangkat (native) Indonesian gizzard shad
 Anodontostoma thailandiae (native) Thai gizzard shad
 Corica laciniata (native) Bangkok river sprat
 Corica soborna (native) Ganges river sprat
 Dayella malabarica (endemic) Day's round herring
 Ehirava fluviatilis (native) Malabar sprat
 Escualosa thoracata (native) White sardine
 Gonialosa manmina (native) Ganges river gizzard shad
 Gudusia chapra (native) Indian river shad
 Herklotsichthys punctatus (questionable) Spotback herring
 Herklotsichthys quadrimaculatus (native) Bluestripe herring

 Hilsa kelee (native) Kelee shad
 Nematalosa galatheae (native) Galathea gizzard shad
 Nematalosa nasus (native) Hairback, Bloch's gizzard shad
 Opisthopterus tardoore (native) Tardoore
 Raconda russeliana (native) Raconda
 Sardinella albella (native) White sardinella
 Sardinella brachysoma (native) Deepbody sardinella
 Sardinella fimbriata (native) Charree addee, Fringescale sardinella
 Sardinella gibbosa (native) Goldstripe sardinella
 Sardinella jussieu (native) Mauritian sardinella
 Sardinella longiceps (native) Indian oil sardine
 Sardinella melanura (native) Blacktip sardinella
 Sardinella sindensis (native) Sind sardinella
 Spratelloides delicatulus (native) Delicate round herring
 Spratelloides gracilis (native) Silver-stripe round herring

 Tenualosa ilisha (native) Ilish
 Tenualosa toli (native) Toli shad

Dussumieriidae (Round herring)
 Dussumieria acuta (native) Rainbow sardine
 Dussumieria elopsoides (native) Slender rainbow sardine

Engraulidae (Anchovies)
 Coilia dussumieri (native) Goldspotted grenadier anchovy
 Coilia grayii (native) Gray's grenadier anchovy
 Coilia neglecta (native) Neglected grenadier anchovy
 Coilia ramcarati (native) Ramcarat grenadier anchovy
 Coilia reynaldi (native) Nil, Reynald's grenadier anchovy
 Encrasicholina devisi (native) Devis' anchovy
 Encrasicholina heteroloba (native) Shorthead anchovy
 Encrasicholina punctifer (native) Buccaneer anchovy
 Setipinna breviceps (questionable) Shorthead hairfin anchovy
 Setipinna brevifilis (endemic) Short-hairfin anchovy
 Setipinna phasa (endemic) Gangetic hairfin anchovy
 Setipinna taty (native) Scaly hairfin anchovy
 Setipinna tenuifilis (native) Common hairfin anchovy
 Stolephorus andhraensis (native) Andhra anchovy
 Stolephorus baganensis (native) Bagan anchovy
 Stolephorus commersonnii (native) Commerson's anchovy
 Stolephorus dubiosus (native) Thai anchovy
 Stolephorus indicus (native) Indian anchovy
 Stolephorus insularis (native) Hardenberg's anchovy
 Stolephorus waitei (native) Spotty-face anchovy
 Thryssa baelama (native) Baelama anchovy
 Thryssa dayi (native) Day's thryssa
 Thryssa dussumieri (native) Dussumier's thryssa
 Thryssa encrasicholoides (native) False baelama anchovy
 Thryssa gautamiensis (native) Gautama thryssa
 Thryssa hamiltonii (native) Hamilton's thryssa
 Thryssa kammalensis (misidentification)  Kammal thryssa
 Thryssa kammalensoides (native) Godavari thryssa
 Thryssa malabarica (native) Malabar thryssa
 Thryssa mystax (native) Moustached thryssa
 Thryssa polybranchialis (native) Humphead thryssa
 Thryssa purava (native) Oblique-jaw thryssa
 Thryssa setirostris (native) Longjaw thryssa
 Thryssa spinidens (native) Bengal thryssa
 Thryssa stenosoma (native) Slender thryssa
 Thryssa vitrirostris (native) Orangemouth anchovy

Pristigasteridae (Pristigasterids)
 Ilisha elongata (native) Elongate ilisha
 Ilisha filigera (native) Coromandel ilisha
 Ilisha kampeni (native) Kampen's ilisha
 Ilisha megaloptera (native) Bigeye ilisha
 Ilisha melastoma (native), Indian ilisha
 Ilisha obfuscata (native), Hidden ilisha
 Ilisha sirishai (native), Lobejaw ilisha
 Ilisha striatula (native), Banded ilisha
 Pellona dayi (native), Day's pellona
 Pellona ditchela (native), Indian pellona

Cypriniformes

Balitoridae (River loaches)
 Aborichthys elongatus (endemic)
 Aborichthys garoensis (endemic)
 Aborichthys kempi (disputed)
 Acanthocobitis botia (native) Gadera, mottled loach
 Acanthocobitis rubidipinnis (native)
 Acanthocobitis zonalternans (native)
 Balitora brucei (native) Gray's stone loach
 Balitora jalpalli (endemic) Silent Valley stone loach
 Balitora mysorensis (endemic) Slender stone loach
 Bhavania australis (endemic) Western Ghat loach
 Homaloptera manipurensis (endemic)
 Homaloptera menoni (endemic)
 Homaloptera montana (endemic) Anamalai loach
 Homaloptera pillaii (endemic)
 Homaloptera santhamparaiensis (native)
 Indoreonectes evezardi (endemic)
 Longischistura bhimachari (endemic)
 Longischistura striata (endemic)
 Mesonoemacheilus guentheri (endemic)
 Mesonoemacheilus herrei (native)
 Mesonoemacheilus pambarensis (endemic)
 Mesonoemacheilus pulchellus (endemic)
 Mesonoemacheilus triangularis (endemic)
 Nemacheilus anguilla (endemic)
 Nemacheilus baluchiorum (native)
 Nemacheilus barapaniensis (native)
 Nemacheilus carletoni (endemic)
 Nemacheilus devdevi (endemic)
 Nemacheilus doonensis (endemic)
 Nemacheilus drassensis (native)
 Nemacheilus gangeticus (endemic)
 Nemacheilus guttatus (native) Guntea loach
 Nemacheilus himachalensis (endemic)
 Nemacheilus kaimurensis (native)
 Nemacheilus keralensis (endemic)
 Nemacheilus kodaguensis (endemic)
 Nemacheilus menoni (native)
 Nemacheilus monilis (endemic)
 Nemacheilus mooreh (endemic)
 Nemacheilus multifasciatus (native)
 Nemacheilus nilgiriensis (endemic)
 Nemacheilus pavonaceus (endemic)
 Nemacheilus periyarensis (native)
 Nemacheilus petrubanarescui (endemic)
 Nemacheilus reticulofasciatus (endemic)
 Nemacheilus rueppelli (endemic)
 Nemacheilus shehensis (native)
 Nemacheilus sikmaiensis (native)
 Nemacheilus singhi (endemic)
 Nemacheilus subfusca (native)
 Nemacheilus tikaderi (endemic)
 Nemachilichthys shimogensis (native)
 Neonoemacheilus assamensis (native)
 Neonoemacheilus labeosus (native)
 Neonoemacheilus morehensis (native)
 Neonoemacheilus peguensis (native)
 Physoschistura elongata (endemic)
 Physoschistura shanensis (questionable)
 Schistura altipedunculatus (native)
 Schistura beavani (native) Creek loach
 Schistura chindwinica (endemic)
 Schistura cincticauda (native)
 Schistura corica (native)
 Schistura dayi (native)
 Schistura denisoni (endemic)
 Schistura horai (native)
 Schistura kangjupkhulensis (native)
 Schistura khugae (native)
 Schistura manipurensis (endemic)
 Schistura montana (endemic) Chitai
 Schistura nagaensis (endemic)
 Schistura nalbanti (native)
 Schistura prashadi (endemic)
 Schistura prashari (native)
 Schistura punjabensis (native)
 Schistura rendahli (native)
 Schistura reticulata (native)
 Schistura rupecula (native)
 Schistura savona (native)
 Schistura scaturigina (native)
 Schistura semiarmata (endemic)
 Schistura sijuensis (endemic)
 Schistura spiloptera (questionable)
 Schistura tigrinum
 Schistura tirapensis (native)
 Schistura vinciguerrae (native)
 Schistura zonata (native)
 Travancoria elongata (endemic)
 Travancoria jonesi (endemic) Travancore loach
 Triplophysa gracilis (native) Gracilis triplophysa-loach
 Triplophysa kashmirensis (endemic)
 Triplophysa ladacensis (native)
 Triplophysa marmorata (endemic) Kashmir triplophysa-loach
 Triplophysa microps (native) Leh triplophysa-loach
 Triplophysa shehensis (endemic) Tilak triplophysa-loach
 Triplophysa stewarti (native)

 Triplophysa stoliczkai (native) Stoliczka triplophysa-loach, Tibetan stone loach
 Triplophysa tenuicauda (native) Tibetan triplophysa-loach
 Triplophysa yasinensis (native) Yasin triplophysa-loach

Cobitidae (Loaches)

 Acantopsis choirorhynchos (native) Banana fish, Horseface loach
 Botia almorhae (native) Almorha loach, Almorha loach
 Botia birdi (native) Birdi loach, Birdi loach
 Botia dario (native) Necktie loach, Bengal loach
 Botia dayi (native) Hora loach, Hora loach
 Botia histrionica (native) Burmese loach
 Botia macracantha
 Botia lohachata (native) Y-loach, Reticulate loach
 Botia macrolineata (native)
 Botia rostrata (native) Gangetic loach, Gangetic loach
 Botia striata (endemic) Tiger loach, Zebra loach
 Enobarbichthys maculatus (endemic) Whitley loach, Whitley loach
 Lepidocephalichthys annandalei (native) Annandale loach, Annandale loach
 Lepidocephalichthys arunachalensis (native)
 Lepidocephalichthys berdmorei (native) Burmese loach, Burmese loach

 Lepidocephalichthys guntea (native) Guntea loach, Guntea loach
 Lepidocephalichthys irrorata (native) Loktak loach, Loktak loach
 Lepidocephalichthys manipurensis (native) Yu loach, Yu loach
 Lepidocephalichthys menoni (native) Tilak loach
 Lepidocephalus coromandelensis (native)
 Lepidocephalus thermalis (native) Malabar loach, Common spiny loach
 Misgurnus anguillicaudatus (native) Japanese weatherfish, Oriental weatherfish
 Neoeucirrhichthys maydelli (native) Goalpara loach, Goalpara loach
 Pangio bashai (endemic)
 Pangio goaensis (endemic) Indian coolie-loach, Indian coolie-loach
 Pangio longipinnis (native)
 Pangio oblonga (native) Pangia coolie-loach, Java loach
 Pangio pangia (native)
 Somileptus gongota (native) Gongota loach, Gongota loach
 Syncrossus berdmorei (native) Blyth's loach, Blyth's loach
 Syncrossus hymenophysa (questionable), Tiger loach

Cyprinidae (Minnows or carps)
 Amblypharyngodon atkinsonii (native) Burmese carplet, Burmese carplet
 Amblypharyngodon melettinus (native) Attentive carplet, Attentive carplet
 Amblypharyngodon microlepis (native) Indian carplet, Indian carplet
 Amblypharyngodon mola (native) Mola carplet, Mola carplet
 Aristichthys nobilis (introduced) Bighead carp, Bighead carp
 Aspidoparia jaya (native) Jaya, Jaya
 Aspidoparia morar (native) Aspidoparia
 Aspidoparia ukhrulensis (native)
 Bangana almorae (native)
 Bangana diplostoma (native) Murree labeo
 Barbodes bovanicus (endemic) Bowany barb, Bowany barb
 Barbodes carnaticus (endemic) Carnatica carp, Carnatic carp
 Barbodes wynaadensis (endemic)
 Barbonymus gonionotus (introduced) Tawes, Java barb
 Barilius bakeri (endemic) Malabar baril
 Barilius barila (native) Barred baril
 Barilius barna (native) Barna baril
 Barilius bendelisis (native) Hamilton's barila

 Barilius canarensis (endemic) Jerdon's baril
 Barilius chatricensis (native)
 Barilius cocsa (native)
 Barilius dimorphicus (endemic)
 Barilius dogarsinghi (endemic) Manipur baril
 Barilius evezardi (endemic) Day's baril
 Barilius gatensis (endemic) River-carp baril
 Barilius lairokensis (native) Ngawa
 Barilius modestus (native) Indus baril
 Barilius nelsoni (native)
 Barilius ngawa (native)
 Barilius radiolatus (endemic) Günther's baril
 Barilius shacra (native) Shacra baril
 Barilius tileo (native) Tileo baril
 Barilius vagra (native) Dudhnea
 Carassius auratus auratus (introduced), Goldfish
 Carassius carassius (introduced) Crucian carp, Crucian carp
 Catla catla (native) Bhakur, Catla
 Chagunius chagunio (native) Chaguni, Chaguni
 Chagunius nicholsi (native)
 Chela cachius (native) Silver hatchet chela
 Chela dadiburjori (endemic) Dadio, Dadio
 Chela fasciata (endemic) Malabar hatchet chela
 Chela laubuca (native) Winged danio, Indian glass barb
 Cirrhinus cirrhosus (native) Mrigal, Mrigal
 Cirrhinus fulungee (endemic) Deccan white carp, Deccan white carp
 Cirrhinus macrops (endemic) Hora white carp, Hora white carp
 Crossocheilus burmanicus (native)
 Crossocheilus diplochilus (native) Kashmir latia
 Crossocheilus latius (native) Gangetic latia
 Crossocheilus periyarensis (endemic)
 Ctenopharyngodon idella (introduced), Grass carp
 Cyprinion semiplotum (native) Assamese kingfish, Assamese kingfish
 Cyprinus carpio carpio (introduced), Common carp
 Danio dangila (native) Dangila danio
 Danio rerio (native) Anju, Zebra danio
 Desmopuntius johorensis (questionable) Melon barb, Striped barb
 Devario acuticephala (endemic) Manipur danio
 Devario aequipinnatus (native) Giant danio, Giant danio
 Devario assamensis (native)
 Devario devario (native) Devario danio, Sind danio
 Devario fraseri (endemic) Fraser danio
 Devario horai (native)
 Devario malabaricus (native) Malabar danio, Malabar danio
 Devario manipurensis (native)
 Devario naganensis (endemic) Naga danio
 Devario neilgherriensis (endemic) Peninsular danio
 Devario regina (native) Fowler's danio
 Devario yuensis (native)
 Diptychus maculatus (native) Tibetan snowtrout, Scaly Osman
 Eechathalakenda ophicephala (endemic) Channa barb, Channa barb
 Esomus barbatus (endemic) South Indian flying barb, South Indian flying barb
 Esomus danricus (native) Indian flying barb
 Esomus lineatus (native), Striped flying barb
 Esomus malabaricus (native)
 Esomus manipurensis (native)
 Esomus thermoicos (native)
 Garra annandalei (native) Annandale garra
 Garra bicornuta (endemic) Tunga garra
 Garra compressus (native)
 Garra elongata (native)
 Garra gotyla gotyla (native) Gadhera, Sucker head
 Garra gotyla stenorhynchus (endemic) Nilgiris garra
 Garra hughi (endemic) Cardamon garra
 Garra kalakadensis (endemic)
 Garra kempi (native) Kemp garra
 Garra lamta (native) Gadhera
 Garra lissorhynchus (endemic) Khasi garra
 Garra litanensis (native)
 Garra manipurensis (native)
 Garra mcclellandi (endemic) Cauvery garra
 Garra menoni (endemic)
 Garra mullya (native) Mullya garra
 Garra naganensis (endemic) Naga garra
 Garra nambulica (native)
 Garra nasuta (native) Khasi garra
 Garra notata (native) Tenasserim garra
 Garra paralissorhynchus (Manipur) 
 Garra periyarensis (native)
 Garra rupecula (endemic) Mishmi garra
 Garra surendranathanii (native)
 Horadandia atukorali (native)
 Horalabiosa arunachalami (native)
 Horalabiosa joshuai (native)
 Horalabiosa palaniensis (native)
 Hypophthalmichthys molitrix (introduced) Silver carp, Silver carp
 Hypselobarbus curmuca (endemic) Curmuca barb, Curmuca barb
 Hypselobarbus dobsoni (endemic) Krishna carp, Krishna carp
 Hypselobarbus dubius (endemic) Nilgiris barb, Nilgiris barb
 Hypselobarbus jerdoni (endemic) Jerdon's carp, Jerdon's carp
 Hypselobarbus kolus (endemic) Kolus, Kolus
 Hypselobarbus kurali (endemic)
 Hypselobarbus lithopidos (endemic) Canara barb, Canara barb
 Hypselobarbus micropogon (endemic) Korhi barb, Korhi barb
 Hypselobarbus periyarensis (native)
 Hypselobarbus pulchellus (endemic)
 Hypselobarbus thomassi (endemic) Red canarese barb, Red Canarese barb
 Labeo angra (native) Angra labeo
 Labeo ariza (native) Ariza labeo, Reba
 Labeo bata (native) Bata labeo, Bata
 Labeo boga (native) Boga labeo
 Labeo boggut (native) Boggut labeo, Boggut labeo
 Labeo caeruleus (questionable) Sind labeo
 Labeo calbasu (native) Karnataka labeo, Orange-fin labeo
 Labeo dussumieri (native) Thooli
 Labeo dyocheilus (native) Boalla
 Labeo fimbriatus (native) Fringed-lipped peninsula carp, Fringed-lipped peninsula carp
 Labeo gonius (native) Kuria labeo, Kuria labeo
 Labeo kawrus (endemic) Deccan labeo
 Labeo kontius (endemic) Pigmouth carp, Pigmouth carp
 Labeo nandina (native)
 Labeo pangusia (native) Pangusia labeo
 Labeo porcellus (native) Bombay labeo
 Labeo potail (endemic) Deccan labeo
 Labeo rajasthanicus (endemic)
 Labeo rohita (native) Rohu, Rohu
 Labeo udaipurensis (endemic)
 Lepidopygopsis typus (endemic) Peninsular hilltrout, Peninsular hilltrout
 Megarasbora elanga (native) Bengala barb, Bengala barb
 Neolissochilus dukai (native)
 Neolissochilus hexagonolepis (native) Katli, Copper mahseer
 Neolissochilus hexastichus (native)
 Neolissochilus pnar (endemic)
 Neolissochilus spinulosus (endemic)
 Oreichthys cosuatis (native)
 Oreichthys umangii (native)
 Osteobrama alfredianus (native)
 Osteobrama bakeri (endemic) Malabar osteobrama
 Osteobrama belangeri (native) Manipur osteobrama
 Osteobrama bhimensis (endemic)
 Osteobrama cotio cotio (native) Cotio
 Osteobrama cotio cunma (native) Cunma osteobrama
 Osteobrama cotio peninsularis (endemic) Peninsular osteobrama
 Osteobrama neilli (endemic) Nilgiri osteobrama
 Osteobrama vigorsii (endemic) Bheema osteobrama
 Osteochilichthys brevidorsalis (endemic) Kantaka barb, Kantaka barb
 Osteochilus hasseltii (native), Silver sharkminnow
 Osteochilus longidorsalis (endemic)
 Osteochilus nashii (endemic) Chandkas barb, Nash's barb
 Osteochilus thomassi (endemic) Konti barb, Konti barb
 Parapsilorhynchus discophorus (endemic) Ratnagiri minnow, Ratnagiri minnow
 Parapsilorhynchus elongatus (native)
 Parapsilorhynchus prateri (endemic) Deolali minnow, Deolali minnow
 Parapsilorhynchus tentaculatus (endemic) Khandalla minnow, Khandalla minnow
 Parluciosoma labiosa (endemic) Slender rasbora
 Poropuntius burtoni (native)
 Poropuntius clavatus (native) Stedman barb, Stedman barb
 Ptychobarbus conirostris (native) Indus snowtrout, Indus snowtrout
 Puntius ambassis (native)
 Puntius amphibius (native) Scarlet-banded barb, Scarlet-banded barb
 Puntius arenatus (endemic) Arenatus barb
 Puntius arulius (endemic) Silas barb, Arulius barb
 Puntius assimilis (native)
 Puntius bimaculatus (native), Redside barb
 Puntius burmanicus (questionable)
 Puntius chalakkudiensis (endemic)
 Puntius chelynoides (native) Dark mahseer, Dark mahseer
 Puntius chola (native) Chola barb, Swamp barb
 Puntius conchonius (native) Red barb, Rosy barb
 Puntius coorgensis (native)
 Puntius crescentus (native)
 Puntius deccanensis (endemic) Deccan barb, Deccan barb
 Puntius denisonii (endemic) Denison barb, Denison barb
 Puntius dorsalis (native) Cauvery barb, Long snouted barb
 Puntius exclamatio (native)
 Puntius fasciatus (endemic) Melon barb, Melon barb
 Puntius filamentosus (native) Black-spot barb, Blackspot barb
 Puntius fraseri (endemic) Dharna barb, Dharna barb
 Puntius gelius (native) Golden barb, Golden barb
 Puntius guganio (native) Glass-barb, Glass-barb
 Puntius kannikattiensis (native)
 Puntius mahecola (native)
 Puntius manipurensis (native)
 Puntius meingangbii (native)
 Puntius melanampyx (native)
 Puntius morehensis (native) Waijabi
 Puntius mudumalaiensis (native)
 Puntius muvattupuzhaensis 
 Puntius nangalensis (native)
 Puntius narayani (endemic) Narayan barb, Narayan barb
 Puntius ornatus (native)
 Puntius orphoides (questionable) Javaen barb, Javaen barb
 Puntius parrah (endemic) Parrah barb
 Puntius phutunio (native) Dwarf barb, Spottedsail barb
 Puntius pleurotaenia (questionable), Black lined barb
 Puntius punctatus (endemic)
 Puntius punjabensis (questionable)
 Puntius puntio (native) Puntio barb, Puntio barb
 Puntius roseipinnis (endemic) Pondicherry barb, Pondicherry barb
 Puntius sahyadriensis (endemic) Khavli barb, Khavli barb
 Puntius sarana (native) Peninsular olive barb, Olive barb
 Puntius setnai (native)
 Puntius shalynius (endemic) Shalyni barb, Shalyni barb
 Puntius sharmai (endemic)
 Puntius sophore (native) Spotfin swamp barb, Pool barb
 Puntius sophoroides (native)
 Puntius tambraparniei (endemic)
 Puntius terio (native) One-spot barb, Onespot barb
 Puntius ticto (native) Thunnus, Ticto barb
 Puntius vittatus (native) Kooli barb, Greenstripe barb
 Puntius waageni (questionable)
 Puntius yuensis (native)

 Raiamas bola (native) Indian trout, Trout barb
 Raiamas guttatus (native) Burmese trout, Burmese trout
 Rasbora caverii (endemic) Cauvery rasbora, Cauvery rasbora
 Rasbora daniconius (native) Blackline rasbora, Slender rasbora
 Rasbora rasbora (native) Gangetic scissortail rasbora, Gangetic scissortail rasbora
 Rasbora vaterifloris (questionable), Pearly rasbora
 Rohtee ogilbii (endemic) Vatani rohtee, Vatani rohtee
 Salmophasia balookee (native) Bloch razorbelly minnow, Bloch razorbelly minnow
 Salmophasia punjabensis (native) Punjab razorbelly minnow, Punjab razorbelly minnow
 Salmostoma acinaces (native) Silver razorbelly minnow, Silver razorbelly minnow
 Salmostoma bacaila (native) Large razorbelly minnow, Large razorbelly minnow
 Salmostoma belachi (native) Belachi
 Salmostoma boopis (endemic) Boopis razorbelly minnow, Boopis razorbelly minnow
 Salmostoma horai (endemic) Hora razorbelly minnow, Hora razorbelly minnow
 Salmostoma novacula (endemic) Novacula razorbelly minnow, Novacula razorbelly minnow
 Salmostoma orissaensis (endemic) Orissa razorbelly minnow, Orissa razorbelly minnow
 Salmostoma phulo (native) Finescale razorbelly minnow, Finescale razorbelly minnow
 Salmostoma sardinella (native) Sardinella razorbelly minnow, Sardinella razorbelly minnow
 Salmostoma untrahi (endemic) Mahanadi razorbelly minnow, Mahanadi razorbelly minnow
 Schismatorhynchos nukta (endemic) Nukta, Nukta
 Schizopyge curvifrons (native) Dapeghat snowtrout, Sattar snowtrout
 Schizopyge niger (native) Alghad snowtrout, Chush snowtrout
 Schizopygopsis stoliczkai (native) Kinnaur snowtrout, False osman
 Schizothorax esocinus (native) Chirruh snowtrout, Chirruh snowtrout
 Schizothorax huegelii (native)
 Schizothorax kumaonensis (endemic) Kumaon snowtrout, Kumaon snowtrout
 Schizothorax labiatus (native) Kunar snowtrout, Kunar snowtrout
 Schizothorax microcephalus (native)
 Schizothorax molesworthi (native)
 Schizothorax nasus (native) Dongu snowtrout, Dongu snowtrout
 Schizothorax plagiostomus (native) Asaila
 Schizothorax progastus (native) Dinnawah snowtrout, Dinnawah snowtrout
 Schizothorax richardsonii (native) Asaila, Snow trout
 Securicula gora (native) Gora-chela
 Semiplotus manipurensis (native)
 Semiplotus modestus (native) Burmese kingfish, Burmese kingfish
 Sinilabeo dero (native) Arangi, Kalabans
 Thynnichthys sandkhol (endemic) Sandkhol carp, Sandkhol carp
 Tinca tinca (introduced) Tench, Tench

 Tor khudree (native) Deccan mahseer, Deccan mahseer
 Tor kulkarnii (native), Dwarf mahseer
 Tor macrolepis (native)
 Tor mussullah (endemic) Mussullah mahseer, Humpback mahseer
 Tor progeneius (endemic) Jungha mahseer, Jungha mahseer
 Tor putitora (native) Chadu, Golden mahseer
 Tor tor (native) Tor mahseer, Mahseer

Psilorhynchidae 
 Psilorhynchus balitora (native) Balitora minnow, Balitora minnow
 Psilorhynchus homaloptera (native) Homaloptera minnow, torrent stone carp
 Psilorhynchus microphthalmus (native)
 Psilorhynchus sucatio (native) Sucatio minnow, river stone carp

Cyprinodontiformes

Aplocheilidae (Killifishes)
 Aplocheilus blockii (native) Green panchax, green panchax
 Aplocheilus dayi (questionable) Day's panchax, Ceylon killifish
 Aplocheilus kirchmayeri (endemic)
 Aplocheilus lineatus (native) Malabar killie, striped panchax
 Aplocheilus panchax (native) Blue panchax
 Aplocheilus parvus (native), Dwarf panchax

Cyprinodontidae (Pupfishes)
 Aphanius dispar dispar (native)

Poeciliidae (Poeciliids)
 Gambusia affinis (introduced) Mosquitofish
 Gambusia holbrooki (introduced) Eastern mosquitofish
 Poecilia reticulata (introduced) Barbados millions, guppy
 Xiphophorus hellerii (introduced) Green swordtail

Elopiformes

Elopidae (Tenpounders)
 Elops machnata (native) Ladyfish, tenpounder

Megalopidae (Tarpons)
 Megalops cyprinoides (native) Oxeye tarpon, Indo-Pacific tarpon

Gadiformes

Bregmacerotidae (Codlets)
 Bregmaceros mcclellandi (native) Spotted codlet

Macrouridae (Grenadiers or rattails)
 Bathygadus furvescens (native)
 Coelorinchus flabellispinnis (native)
 Coelorinchus parallelus (native) Spiny grenadier
 Coryphaenoides hextii (native)
 Coryphaenoides macrolophus (native)
 Coryphaenoides nasutus (questionable) Largenose grenadier
 Coryphaenoides woodmasoni (native)
 Gadomus multifilis (native)
 Hymenocephalus italicus (native) Glasshead grenadier
 Malacocephalus laevis (native) Softhead grenadier
 Sphagemacrurus pumiliceps (native)

Moridae (Morid cods)
 Physiculus argyropastus (native)

Gasterosteiformes

Pegasidae (Seamoths)
 Eurypegasus draconis (native) Short dragonfish
 Pegasus laternarius (native)
 Pegasus volitans (native) Longtail seamoth

Chanidae (Milkfish)
 Chanos chanos (native) Milkfish

Hexanchiformes

Hexanchidae (Cow sharks)
 Heptranchias perlo (native) Sharpnose sevengill shark

Lamniformes

Alopiidae (Thresher sharks)
 Alopias pelagicus (native) Pelagic thresher
 Alopias superciliosus (native) Bigeye thresher
 Alopias vulpinus (native) Thintail thresher

Lamnidae (Mackerel sharks or white shark)
 Isurus oxyrinchus (native) Shortfin shark, Shortfin mako

Odontaspididae (Sand tigers)
 Carcharias taurus (native), Sand tiger shark
 Carcharias tricuspidatus (native) Blue nurse sand-tiger, Indian sand tiger

Lampriformes

Lophotidae (Crestfishes)
 Eumecichthys fiski (native), Unicorn crestfish

Veliferidae (Velifers)
 Velifer hypselopterus (native), Sailfin velifer

Lophiiformes

Antennariidae (Frogfishes)
 Antennarius coccineus (native), Scarlet frogfish
 Antennarius hispidus (native), Shaggy angler
 Antennarius indicus (native), Indian frogfish
 Antennarius nummifer (native), Spotfin frogfish
 Antennarius pictus (native), Painted frogfish
 Antennarius striatus (native), Striated frogfish
 Histrio histrio (native), Sargassum fish

Chaunacidae (Sea toads)
 Chaunax pictus (native), Pink frogmouth

Diceratiidae (Double anglers)
 Diceratias bispinosus (native), Two-rod anglerfish

Lophiidae (Goosefishes)
 Lophiodes gracilimanus (native)
 Lophiodes mutilus (native), Smooth angler
 Lophiomus setigerus (native), Blackmouth angler

Ogcocephalidae (Batfishes)
 Dibranchus nasutus (native)
 Halicmetus ruber (native)
 Halieutaea coccinea (native)
 Halieutaea indica (native), Indian handfish
 Halieutaea stellata (native), Starry handfish

Oneirodidae (Dreamers)
 Lophodolos indicus (native)

Myctophiformes

Myctophidae (Lanternfishes)
 Bolinichthys pyrsobolus (native)
 Centrobranchus andreae (native), Andre's lanternfish
 Diaphus luetkeni (native)
 Diaphus splendidus (native)
 Hygophum reinhardtii (native), Reinhardt's lantern fish
 Myctophum affine (questionable), Metallic lantern fish
 Myctophum aurolaternatum (native), Golden lanternfish
 Myctophum indicum (native)
 Myctophum spinosum (native), Spiny lantern fish
 Symbolophorus evermanni (native), Evermann's lantern fish

Neoscopelidae 
 Neoscopelus macrolepidotus (questionable), Large-scaled lantern fish
 Scopelengys tristis (questionable), Pacific blackchin

Notacanthiformes

Halosauridae (Halosaurs)
 Aldrovandia affinis (native), Gilbert's halosaurid fish
 Aldrovandia mediorostris (native)
 Aldrovandia phalacra (native), Hawaiian halosaurid fish
 Halosaurus parvipennis (native)

Ophidiiformes

Bythitidae (Viviparous brotulas)
 Dinematichthys iluocoeteoides (native), Yellow pigmy brotula

Carapidae (Pearlfishes)
 Carapus boraborensis (native), Pinhead pearlfish
 Carapus mourlani (native), Star pearlfish
 Encheliophis gracilis (native), Graceful pearlfish
 Encheliophis homei (native), Silver pearlfish

Ophidiidae (Cusk-eels)
 Bassozetus glutinosus (native)
 Brotula multibarbata (native), Goatsbeard brotula
 Dicrolene introniger (questionable), Digitate cusk eel
 Enchelybrotula paucidens (native)
 Glyptophidium argenteum (native)
 Holcomycteronus pterotus (native)
 Monomitopus conjugator (native)
 Monomitopus nigripinnis (native)
 Neobythites steatiticus (native)
 Porogadus trichiurus (native)
 Tauredophidium hextii (native)

Orectolobiformes

Ginglymostomatidae (Nurse sharks)
 Nebrius ferrugineus (native) Giant sleepy shark, Tawny nurse shark

Hemiscylliidae (Bamboo sharks)
 Chiloscyllium arabicum (native), Arabian carpetshark
 Chiloscyllium griseum (native) Grey bambooshark, Grey bambooshark
 Chiloscyllium indicum (native) Slender bambooshark, Slender bambooshark
 Chiloscyllium plagiosum (native), Whitespotted bambooshark
 Chiloscyllium punctatum (native), Brownbanded bambooshark

Rhincodontidae (Whale shark)
 Rhincodon typus (native) Whale shark, Whale shark

Stegostomatidae (Zebra sharks)
 Stegostoma fasciatum (native) Zebra shark, Zebra shark

Osmeriformes

Alepocephalidae (Slickheads)
 Aulastomatomorpha phospherops (native)
 Bathytroctes squamosus (questionable)
 Narcetes erimelas (native)

Platytroctidae (Tubeshoulders)
 Platytroctes apus (native), Legless searsid
 Platytroctes mirus (native), Leaf searsid

Osteoglossiformes

Notopteridae (Featherbacks or knifefishes)
 Chitala chitala (native), Clown knifefish
 Notopterus notopterus (native) Feather back, Bronze featherback

Perciformes

Acanthuridae (Surgeonfishes, tangs, unicornfishes)

 Acanthurus gahhm (questionable), Black surgeonfish
 Acanthurus leucosternon (native), Powderblue surgeonfish
 Acanthurus lineatus (native) Blue linned surgeonfish, Lined surgeonfish
 Acanthurus mata (native), Elongate surgeonfish
 Acanthurus nigricans (native), Whitecheek surgeonfish
 Acanthurus nigrofuscus (native), Brown surgeonfish
 Acanthurus nigroris (native), Bluelined surgeonfish
 Acanthurus pyroferus (native), Chocolate surgeonfish
 Acanthurus tennentii (native), Doubleband surgeonfish
 Acanthurus thompsoni (native), Thompson's surgeonfish
 Acanthurus triostegus (native), Convict surgeonfish
 Acanthurus xanthopterus (native), Yellowfin surgeonfish
 Ctenochaetus striatus (native), Striated surgeonfish
 Ctenochaetus strigosus (questionable), Spotted surgeonfish
 Ctenochaetus truncatus (native)
 Naso brachycentron (native), Humpback unicornfish
 Naso brevirostris (native), Spotted unicornfish
 Naso lituratus (misidentification), Orangespine unicornfish
 Naso tonganus (native), Bulbnose unicornfish
 Naso tuberosus (native), Humpnose unicornfish
 Naso unicornis (native), Bluespine unicornfish
 Naso vlamingii (native), Bignose unicornfish
 Paracanthurus hepatus (native), Palette surgeonfish
 Zebrasoma flavescens (questionable), Yellow tang
 Zebrasoma veliferum (misidentification), Sailfin tang
 Zebrasoma xanthurum (native), Yellowtail tang

Acropomatidae (Lanternbellies, temperate ocean-basses)
 Acropoma japonicum (native), Glowbelly
 Synagrops philippinensis (native)

Ambassidae (Asiatic glassfishes)
 Ambassis ambassis (native) Commerson's glassy perchlet, Commerson's glassy
 Ambassis buton (native) Buton glassy perchlet, Buton glassy perchlet
 Ambassis dussumieri (native) Malabar glassy perchlet, Malabar glassy perchlet
 Ambassis gymnocephalus (native) Bald glassy perchlet, Bald glassy
 Ambassis interrupta (native) Interrupta glassy perchlet, Long-spined glass perchlet
 Ambassis kopsii (native) Singapore glassy perchlet, Freckled hawkfish
 Ambassis macracanthus (native), Estuarine glass perchlet
 Ambassis miops (native) Myops glassy perchlet, Flag-tailed glass perchlet
 Ambassis nalua (native) Nalua-chanda, Scalloped perchlet
 Ambassis urotaenia (native) Banded-tail glassy perchlet, Banded-tail glassy perchlet
 Chanda nama (native) Elongate glass-perchlet, Elongate glass-perchlet
 Parambassis dayi (endemic) Day's glass fish, Day's glassy perchlet
 Parambassis lala (native) Highfin glassy perchlet, Highfin glassy perchlet
 Parambassis ranga (native) Indian glassy fish, Indian glassy fish
 Parambassis thomassi (endemic) Western Ghat glassy perchlet, Western Ghat glassy perchlet
 Pseudambassis baculis (native) Himalayan glassy perchlet, Himalayan glassy perchlet

Ammodytidae (Sand lances)
 Bleekeria kallolepis (native)

Anabantidae (Climbing gouramies)
 Anabas cobojius (native) Gangetic koi
 Anabas testudineus (native) Climbing perch

Apogonidae (Cardinalfishes)
 Apogon apogonoides (native), Short-tooth cardinal
 Apogon coccineus (native), Ruby cardinalfish
 Apogon endekataenia (questionable), Candystripe cardinalfish
 Apogon fasciatus (native), Broad-banded cardinalfish
 Apogon fleurieu (native), Cardinalfish
 Apogon fraenatus (native), Bridled cardinalfish
 Apogon guamensis (native), Guam cardinalfish
 Apogon holotaenia (native), Copperstriped cardinalfish
 Apogon kallopterus (native), Iridescent cardinalfish
 Apogon leptacanthus (native), Threadfin cardinalfish
 Apogon moluccensis (native), Moluccan cardinalfish
 Apogon novemfasciatus (questionable), Sevenstriped cardinalfish
 Apogon oxina (native)
 Apogon poecilopterus (native), Pearly-finned cardinalfish
 Apogon quadrifasciatus (native), Twostripe cardinal
 Apogon sangiensis (native), Sangi cardinalfish
 Apogon savayensis (native), Samoan cardinalfish
 Apogon taeniatus (questionable), Twobelt cardinal
 Apogon taeniophorus (native), Reef-flat cardinalfish
 Apogonichthys ocellatus (native), Ocellated cardinalfish
 Archamia bleekeri (native)
 Archamia fucata (native), Orangelined cardinalfish
 Cheilodipterus arabicus (native), Tiger cardinal
 Cheilodipterus lachneri (questionable)
 Cheilodipterus quinquelineatus (native), Five-lined cardinalfish
 Foa brachygramma (native), Weed cardinalfish
 Fowleria aurita (native), Crosseyed cardinalfish
 Gymnapogon africanus (questionable), Crystal cardinal
 Pseudamia gelatinosa (native), Gelatinous cardinalfish
 Rhabdamia cypselura (native), Swallowtail cardinalfish
 Rhabdamia gracilis (native), Luminous cardinalfish

Ariommatidae (Ariommatids)
 Ariomma indica (native), Indian ariomma

Badidae 
 Badis assamensis (native)
 Badis badis (native) Blue perch
 Badis blosyrus (native)
 Badis britzi (native)
 Badis kanabos (native)
 Badis tuivaiei (native)
 Dario dario (native) Scarlet badis

Bathyclupeidae 
 Bathyclupea hoskynii (native)

Blenniidae (Combtooth blennies)
 Alticus kirkii (native) Kirk's blenny
 Andamia reyi (native) Suckerlip blenny
 Antennablennius bifilum (native) Horned rockskipper
 Aspidontus tractus (native)
 Blenniella leopardus (native)
 Blenniella periophthalmus (native) Blue-dashed rockskipper
 Cirripectes castaneus (native) Chestnut eyelash-blenny
 Cirripectes filamentosus (native) Filamentous blenny
 Cirripectes perustus (native) Flaming blenny
 Cirripectes polyzona (native)
 Cirripectes quagga (native) Squiggly blenny
 Cirripectes stigmaticus (native) Red-streaked blenny
 Cirripectes variolosus (questionable) Red-speckled blenny
 Ecsenius midas (native) Persian blenny
 Ecsenius pulcher (native)
 Enchelyurus kraussii (native) Krauss' blenny
 Entomacrodus striatus (native) Reef margin blenny
 Entomacrodus vermiculatus (native) Vermiculated blenny
 Exallias brevis (native) Leopard blenny
 Haptogenys bipunctata (native)
 Hirculops cornifer (native) Highbrow rockskipper
 Istiblennius dussumieri (native) Streaky rockskipper
 Istiblennius edentulus (native) Rippled rockskipper
 Istiblennius lineatus (native) Lined rockskipper
 Istiblennius spilotus (native) Spotted rockskipper
 Meiacanthus smithi (native) Disco blenny
 Mimoblennius atrocinctus (native)
 Omobranchus elongatus (native) Cloister blenny
 Omobranchus fasciolatus (native) Arab blenny
 Omobranchus ferox (native) Gossamer blenny
 Omobranchus obliquus (native)
 Omobranchus punctatus (native) Muzzled blenny
 Omobranchus zebra (native) Zebra blenny
 Parablennius thysanius (native) Tasseled blenny
 Petroscirtes breviceps (native) Striped poison-fang blenny mimic
 Petroscirtes mitratus (native) Floral blenny
 Petroscirtes xestus (native) Xestus sabretooth blenny
 Plagiotremus rhinorhynchos (native) Bluestriped fangblenny
 Plagiotremus tapeinosoma (native) Piano fangblenny
 Salarias fasciatus (native) Jewelled blenny
 Salarias reticulatus (sp. nov.)
 Scartella emarginata (native) Maned blenny
 Xiphasia setifer (native) Hairtail blenny

Caesionidae (Fusiliers)

 Caesio caerulaurea (native), Blue and gold fusilier
 Caesio cuning (native), Redbelly yellowtail fusilier
 Caesio lunaris (native), Lunar fusilier
 Caesio teres (native), Yellow and blueback fusilier
 Caesio varilineata (native), Variable-lined fusilier
 Caesio xanthonota (native), Yellowback fusilier
 Dipterygonotus balteatus (native), Mottled fusilier
 Gymnocaesio gymnoptera (native), Slender fusilier
 Pterocaesio chrysozona (native), Goldband fusilier
 Pterocaesio digramma (questionable), Double-lined fusilier
 Pterocaesio pisang (native), Banana fusilier
 Pterocaesio tessellata (native), One-stripe fusilier
 Pterocaesio tile (native), Dark-banded fusilier

Callionymidae (Dragonets)
 Bathycallionymus kaianus (native)
 Callionymus carebares (native), Indian deepwater dragonet
 Callionymus erythraeus (native), Smallhead dragonet
 Callionymus fluviatilis (native) River dragonet, River dragonet
 Callionymus japonicus (questionable)
 Callionymus kotthausi (native)
 Callionymus margaretae (native), Margaret's dragonet
 Callionymus megastomus (native)
 Callionymus sagitta (native) Arrow headed dragonet, Arrow dragonet
 Eleutherochir opercularis (native) Indian dragonet, Flap-gilled dragonet

Carangidae (Jacks and pompanos)
 Alectis ciliaris (native), African pompano
 Alectis indicus (native), Indian threadfish
 Alepes djedaba (native), Shrimp scad
 Alepes kleinii (native), Razorbelly scad
 Alepes melanoptera (native), Blackfin scad
 Alepes vari (native), Herring scad
 Atropus atropos (native), Cleftbelly trevally
 Atule mate (native), Yellowtail scad
 Carangoides armatus (native), Longfin trevally
 Carangoides chrysophrys (native), Longnose trevally
 Carangoides ciliarius (questionable)
 Carangoides coeruleopinnatus (native), Coastal trevally
 Carangoides dinema (native), Shadow trevally
 Carangoides ferdau (native), Blue trevally
 Carangoides fulvoguttatus (native), Yellowspotted trevally
 Carangoides gymnostethus (native), Bludger
 Carangoides hedlandensis (native), Bumpnose trevally
 Carangoides humerosus (native), Duskyshoulder trevally
 Carangoides malabaricus (native), Malabar trevally
 Carangoides oblongus (native), Coachwhip trevally
 Carangoides orthogrammus (native), Island trevally
 Carangoides plagiotaenia (native), Barcheek trevally
 Carangoides praeustus (native) Brown-backed trevally, Brownback trevally
 Carangoides talamparoides (native), Impostor trevally
 Caranx heberi (native), Blacktip trevally
 Caranx hippos (questionable) Blacktailed trevally, Crevalle jack
 Caranx ignobilis (native) Giant kingfish, Giant trevally
 Caranx lugubris (native), Black jack
 Caranx melampygus (native), Bluefin trevally
 Caranx papuensis (native), Brassy trevally
 Caranx sexfasciatus (native), Bigeye trevally
 Caranx tille (native), Tille trevally
 Decapterus macarellus (native), Mackerel scad
 Decapterus macrosoma (native), Shortfin scad
 Decapterus russelli (native), Indian scad
 Elagatis bipinnulata (native), Rainbow runner
 Gnathanodon speciosus (native), Golden trevally
 Megalaspis cordyla (native) Torpedo scad, Torpedo scad
 Naucrates ductor (native), Pilotfish
 Parastromateus niger (native) Brown pomfret, Black pomfret
 Scomberoides commersonnianus (native), Talang queenfish
 Scomberoides lysan (native) Double-spotted queenfish, Doublespotted queenfish
 Scomberoides tala (native), Barred queenfish
 Scomberoides tol (native), Needlescaled queenfish
 Selar boops (native), Oxeye scad
 Selar crumenophthalmus (native), Bigeye scad
 Selaroides leptolepis (native), Yellowstripe scad
 Seriola lalandi (native), Yellowtail amberjack
 Seriola rivoliana (native), Almaco jack
 Seriolina nigrofasciata (native), Blackbanded trevally
 Trachinotus baillonii (native), Smallspotted dart
 Trachinotus blochii (native), Snubnose pompano
 Trachinotus botla (native), Largespotted dart
 Trachinotus mookalee (native), Indian pompano
 Ulua mentalis (native), Longrakered trevally
 Uraspis helvola (native), Whitemouth jack
 Uraspis secunda (native), Cottonmouth jack
 Uraspis uraspis (native), Whitetongue jack

Centrogenyidae 
 Centrogenys vaigiensis (native), False scorpionfish

Centrolophidae (Medusafishes)
 Psenopsis cyanea (native), Indian ruff

Cepolidae (Bandfishes)
 Acanthocepola indica (native)

Chaetodontidae (Butterflyfishes)
 Chaetodon andamanensis (native)
 Chaetodon auriga (native), Threadfin butterflyfish
 Chaetodon bennetti (native), Bluelashed butterflyfish
 Chaetodon citrinellus (native), Speckled butterflyfish
 Chaetodon collare (native), Redtail butterflyfish
 Chaetodon decussatus (native), Indian vagabond butterflyfish
 Chaetodon falcula (native), Blackwedged butterflyfish
 Chaetodon kleinii (native), Sunburst butterflyfish
 Chaetodon lunula (native), Raccoon butterflyfish
 Chaetodon melannotus (native), Blackback butterflyfish
 Chaetodon meyeri (native), Scrawled butterflyfish
 Chaetodon octofasciatus (native), Eightband butterflyfish
 Chaetodon punctatofasciatus (questionable), Spotband butterflyfish
 Chaetodon speculum (native), Mirror butterflyfish
 Chaetodon trifascialis (native), Chevron butterflyfish
 Chaetodon trifasciatus (native), Melon butterflyfish
 Chaetodon vagabundus (native), Vagabond butterflyfish
 Chaetodon xanthocephalus (native), Yellowhead butterflyfish
 Chelmon rostratus (native), Copperband butterflyfish
 Forcipiger longirostris (native), Longnose butterflyfish
 Hemitaurichthys zoster (native), Brown-and-white butterflyfish
 Heniochus acuminatus (native) Pennant coral fish, Pennant coralfish
 Heniochus chrysostomus (native), Threeband pennantfish
 Heniochus monoceros (native), Masked bannerfish
 Heniochus pleurotaenia (native), Phantom bannerfish
 Heniochus singularius (native), Singular bannerfish
 Parachaetodon ocellatus (native), Sixspine butterflyfish

Champsodontidae 
 Champsodon capensis (questionable), Gaper
 Champsodon vorax (questionable)

Channidae (Snakeheads)
 Channa amphibeus (native) Borna snakehead, Borna snakehead
 Channa barca (native) Barca snakehead, Barca snakehead
 Channa bleheri (native)
 Channa diplogramma (native)
 Channa gachua (native) Bothua
 Channa marulius (native) Bullseye snakehead, Great snakehead
 Channa micropeltes (misidentification) Malabar snakehead, Giant snakehead
 Channa orientalis (native) Asiatic snakehead, Walking snakehead
 Channa punctata (native) Spotted snakehead, Spotted snakehead
 Channa stewartii (native) Assamese snakehead, Assamese snakehead
 Channa striata (native) Banded snakehead, Snakehead murrel

Cichlidae (Cichlids)

 Etroplus canarensis (endemic) Canara pearlspot, Canara pearlspot
 Etroplus maculatus (native) Orange chromide, Orange chromide
 Etroplus suratensis (native) Green chromide, Green chromide
 Oreochromis mossambicus (introduced) Mozambique cichlid, Mozambique tilapia
 Oreochromis niloticus niloticus (introduced), Nile tilapia

Cirrhitidae (Hawkfishes)
 Cirrhitichthys aureus (native), Yellow hawkfish
 Cirrhitichthys bleekeri (native)
 Cirrhitus pinnulatus (native), Stocky hawkfish
 Paracirrhites forsteri (native), Blackside hawkfish

Coryphaenidae (Dolphinfishes)
 Coryphaena equiselis (native), Pompano dolphinfish
 Coryphaena hippurus (native), Common dolphinfish

Creediidae (Sandburrowers)
 Chalixodytes tauensis (questionable), Saddled sandburrower

Datnioididae 

 Datnioides polota (native) Four-barred tigerfish, Four-barred tigerfish

Drepaneidae (Sicklefishes)

 Drepane longimana (native), Concertina fish
 Drepane punctata (native) Spotted sicklefish, Spotted sicklefish

Echeneidae (Remoras)
 Echeneis naucrates (native), Live sharksucker
 Phtheirichthys lineatus (native), Slender suckerfish
 Remora osteochir (native), Marlin sucker
 Remora remora (native) Common remora, Common remora
 Remorina albescens (native), White suckerfish

Eleotridae (Sleepers)
 Bostrychus sinensis (native), Four-eyed sleeper
 Butis amboinensis (native), Olive flathead-gudgeon
 Butis butis (native) Duckbill sleeper, Duckbill sleeper
 Butis gymnopomus (native)
 Butis koilomatodon (native), Mud sleeper
 Butis melanostigma (native) Blackspot sleeper, Black-spotted gudgeon
 Eleotris fusca (native) Dusky sleeper, Dusky sleeper
 Eleotris lutea (native) Lutea sleeper, Lutea sleeper
 Eleotris melanosoma (native) Broadhead sleeper, Broadhead sleeper
 Incara multisquamatus (native) Incara
 Odonteleotris macrodon (native) Gangetic sleeper, Gangetic sleeper
 Ophieleotris aporos (native) Aporos sleeper, Snakehead gudgeon
 Ophiocara porocephala (native) Flathead sleeper, Northern mud gudgeon

Emmelichthyidae (Rovers)
 Erythrocles acarina (native)

Ephippidae (Spadefishes, batfishes and scats)

 Ephippus orbis (native), Orbfish
 Platax pinnatus (questionable), Dusky batfish
 Platax teira (native), Tiera batfish
 Tripterodon orbis (questionable), African spadefish

Gempylidae (Snake mackerels)
 Epinnula magistralis (native), Domine
 Gempylus serpens (native), Snake mackerel
 Lepidocybium flavobrunneum (native), Escolar
 Nealotus tripes (native), Black snake mackerel
 Neoepinnula orientalis (native), Sackfish
 Promethichthys prometheus (native), Roudi escolar
 Rexea bengalensis (native), Bengal escolar
 Rexea prometheoides (native), Royal escolar
 Ruvettus pretiosus (native), Oilfish
 Thyrsitoides marleyi (native), Black snoek

Gerreidae (Mojarras)
 Gerres erythrourus (native), Deep-bodied mojarra
 Gerres filamentosus (native) Whiptail silver-biddy, Whipfin silverbiddy
 Gerres limbatus (native), Saddleback silver-biddy
 Gerres longirostris (native) Strongspine silver-biddy, Longtail silverbiddy
 Gerres macracanthus (native)
 Gerres oblongus (native), Slender silverbiddy
 Gerres oyena (native) Common silvery-biddy, Common silver-biddy
 Gerres phaiya (native) Phaiya, Strong spined silver-biddy
 Gerres setifer (native) Small Bengal silver-biddy, Small Bengal silver-biddy
 Pentaprion longimanus (native), Longfin mojarra

Gobiidae (Gobies)
 Acentrogobius bontii (native)
 Acentrogobius caninus (native), Tropical sand goby
 Acentrogobius cyanomos (native)
 Acentrogobius ennorensis (native)
 Acentrogobius griseus (endemic) Grey goby, Grey goby
 Acentrogobius masoni (native)
 Acentrogobius viridipunctatus (native), Spotted green goby
 Amblyeleotris gymnocephala (native), Masked shrimpgoby
 Amblygobius albimaculatus (native), Butterfly goby
 Amblyotrypauchen arctocephalus (native)
 Amoya madraspatensis (native)
 Apocryptes bato (native)
 Apocryptodon madurensis (native)
 Asterropteryx semipunctata (native), Starry goby
 Awaous grammepomus (native), Scribbled goby
 Awaous guamensis (native)
 Awaous melanocephalus (native), Largesnout goby
 Awaous ocellaris (native)
 Bathygobius cyclopterus (native), Spotted frillgoby
 Bathygobius fuscus (native) Frill goby, Dusky frillgoby
 Bathygobius niger (native), Black minigoby
 Bathygobius ostreicola (endemic)
 Bathygobius petrophilus (questionable)
 Bathygobius smithi (native)
 Boleophthalmus boddarti (native), Boddart's goggle-eyed goby
 Boleophthalmus dussumieri (native)
 Boleophthalmus pectinirostris (questionable)
 Brachyamblyopus brachysoma (native)
 Brachygobius nunus (native) Bumblebee goby
 Callogobius hasseltii (native), Hasselt's goby
 Callogobius seshaiyai (endemic)
 Caragobius urolepis (native) Sumatra eelgoby, Scaleless worm goby
 Chiramenu fluviatilis (native)
 Ctenogobiops crocineus (native), Silverspot shrimpgoby
 Ctenotrypauchen microcephalus (native) Comb goby, Comb goby
 Drombus globiceps (native) Bighead goby
 Egglestonichthys melanoptera (native)
 Eugnathogobius oligactis (native)
 Eviota distigma (native), Twospot pygmy goby
 Exyrias puntang (native), Puntang goby
 Favonigobius reichei (native) Tropical sand goby, Indo-Pacific tropical sand goby
 Fusigobius neophytus (native), Common fusegoby
 Glossogobius giuris (native) Tank goby, Tank goby
 Glossogobius kokius (native)
 Glossogobius mas (native)
 Gnatholepis cauerensis cauerensis (native), Eyebar goby
 Gobiodon citrinus (native), Poison goby
 Gobiodon rivulatus (native), Rippled coralgoby
 Gobiopsis canalis (native), Checkered goby
 Gobiopsis macrostoma (native), Longjaw goby
 Gobiopsis woodsi (native)
 Gobiopterus chuno (native), Glass goby
 Hemigobius hoevenii (questionable)
 Hetereleotris zonata (native), Goggles
 Istigobius diadema (native)
 Istigobius ornatus (native), Ornate goby
 Istigobius perspicillatus (native)
 Istigobius spence (native), Pearl goby
 Mahidolia mystacina (native) Smiling goby, Flagfin prawn goby
 Obliquogobius cometes (native)
 Odontamblyopus roseus (native)
 Odontamblyopus rubicundus (native) Rubicundus eelgoby
 Oligolepis acutipennis (native) Sharptail goby, Sharptail goby
 Oligolepis cylindriceps (native)
 Oxuderces dentatus (native)
 Oxyurichthys dasi (native)
 Oxyurichthys formosanus (native)
 Oxyurichthys microlepis (native) Maned goby, Maned goby
 Oxyurichthys ophthalmonema (native), Eyebrow goby
 Oxyurichthys paulae (native) Jester goby, Jester goby
 Oxyurichthys tentacularis (native)
 Parachaeturichthys ocellatus (native)
 Parachaeturichthys polynema (native) Taileyed goby, Taileyed goby
 Paragobiodon echinocephalus (native), Redhead goby
 Parapocryptes rictuosus (native)
 Parapocryptes serperaster (native)
 Periophthalmodon schlosseri (native), Giant mudskipper
 Periophthalmodon septemradiatus (native)
 Periophthalmus argentilineatus (native), Barred mudskipper
 Periophthalmus barbarus (questionable), Atlantic mudskipper
 Periophthalmus chrysospilos (native)
 Periophthalmus minutus (native)
 Periophthalmus novemradiatus (native) Pearse's mudskipper, Pearse's mudskipper
 Periophthalmus waltoni (questionable), Walton's mudskipper
 Periophthalmus weberi (questionable) Weber's mudskipper, Weber's mudskipper
 Pleurosicya bilobata (native), Bilobed ghost goby
 Priolepis eugenius (native), Noble goby
 Priolepis inhaca (native), Brick goby
 Psammogobius biocellatus (native) Sleepy goby, Sleepy goby
 Pseudapocryptes elongatus (native)
 Pseudogobius javanicus (native)
 Pseudogobius melanostictus (native)
 Pseudogobius poicilosoma (native)
 Pseudotrypauchen multiradiatus (native)
 Scartelaos cantoris (native)
 Scartelaos histophorus (native), Walking goby
 Scartelaos tenuis (questionable), Indian Ocean slender mudskipper
 Schismatogobius deraniyagalai (native), Redneck goby
 Sicyopterus griseus (native)
 Sicyopterus microcephalus (native)
 Silhouettea indica (native)
 Stenogobius gymnopomus (native)
 Stenogobius laterisquamatus (questionable)
 Stigmatogobius minima (native)

 Stigmatogobius sadanundio (native)
 Taenioides anguillaris (native) Anguilla eelgoby, Eel worm goby
 Taenioides buchanani (native) Burmese gobyeel, Burmese gobyeel
 Taenioides cirratus (native) Hooghly gobyeel, Bearded worm goby
 Taenioides gracilis (native), Slender eel goby
 Trimma annosum (native), Greybearded pygmy goby
 Trypauchen vagina (native) Burrowing goby
 Trypauchenichthys sumatrensis (native)
 Valenciennea muralis (native), Mural goby
 Valenciennea sexguttata (native), Sixspot goby
 Valenciennea strigata (native), Blueband goby
 Yongeichthys criniger (native)
 Yongeichthys tuticorinensis (native)

Haemulidae (Grunts)

 Diagramma pictum (native), Painted sweetlips
 Plectorhinchus albovittatus (native), Two-striped sweetlips
 Plectorhinchus ceylonensis (questionable), Sri Lanka sweetlips
 Plectorhinchus chubbi (native), Dusky rubberlip
 Plectorhinchus diagrammus (questionable), Striped sweetlips
 Plectorhinchus gibbosus (native), Harry hotlips
 Plectorhinchus lineatus (native), Yellowbanded sweetlips
 Plectorhinchus nigrus (native)
 Plectorhinchus orientalis (native), Oriental sweetlips
 Plectorhinchus picus (native), Painted sweetlip
 Plectorhinchus polytaenia (native), Ribboned sweetlips
 Plectorhinchus schotaf (native), Minstrel sweetlip
 Pomadasys argenteus (native) Silver grunt, Silver grunt
 Pomadasys argyreus (native) Bluecheek silver grunt, Bluecheek silver grunt
 Pomadasys commersonnii (native) Spotted grunter, Smallspotted grunter
 Pomadasys furcatus (native), Banded grunter
 Pomadasys guoraca (native)
 Pomadasys hasta (native)
 Pomadasys kaakan (native), Javelin grunter
 Pomadasys maculatus (native), Saddle grunt
 Pomadasys multimaculatum (native), Cock grunter
 Pomadasys olivaceus (native), Olive grunt
 Pomadasys stridens (native), Striped piggy

Istiophoridae (Billfishes)
 Istiophorus platypterus (native) Sailfish, Indo-Pacific sailfish
 Makaira indica (native) Short nosed sword fish, Black marlin
 Makaira mazara (native), Indo-Pacific blue marlin
 Makaira nigricans (questionable), Atlantic blue marlin
 Tetrapturus angustirostris (native), Shortbill spearfish
 Tetrapturus audax (native), Striped marlin

Kraemeriidae (Sand darters)
 Kraemeria samoensis (native), Samoan sand dart

Kuhliidae (Aholeholes)
 Kuhlia mugil (native) Barred flagtail, Barred flagtail
 Kuhlia rupestris (native) Rock flagtail, Rock flagtail

Kurtidae (Nurseryfishes)
 Kurtus indicus (native) Indian humphead, Indian hump head

Kyphosidae (Sea chubs)
 Kyphosus bigibbus (native), Grey sea chub
 Kyphosus cinerascens (native), Blue seachub
 Kyphosus vaigiensis (native), Brassy chub

Labridae (Wrasses)
 Anampses caeruleopunctatus (native), Bluespotted wrasse
 Anampses meleagrides (native), Spotted wrasse
 Bodianus neilli (native), Bay of Bengal hogfish
 Cheilinus chlorourus (native), Floral wrasse
 Cheilinus fasciatus (native), Redbreast wrasse
 Cheilinus oxycephalus (native), Snooty wrasse
 Cheilinus trilobatus (native), Tripletail wrasse
 Cheilinus undulatus (native), Humphead wrasse
 Cheilio inermis (native), Cigar wrasse
 Choerodon anchorago (native), Orange-dotted tuskfish
 Choerodon robustus (native), Robust tuskfish
 Cirrhilabrus exquisitus (native), Exquisite wrasse
 Coris aygula (native), Clown coris
 Coris formosa (native), Queen coris
 Coris gaimard (questionable), Yellowtail coris
 Cymolutes lecluse (questionable), Sharp-headed wrasse
 Epibulus insidiator (native), Slingjaw wrasse
 Gomphosus caeruleus (native), Green birdmouth wrasse
 Gomphosus varius (native), Bird wrasse
 Halichoeres argus (native), Argus wrasse
 Halichoeres hortulanus (native), Checkerboard wrasse
 Halichoeres marginatus (native), Dusky wrasse
 Halichoeres nebulosus (native), Nebulous wrasse
 Halichoeres nigrescens (native), Bubblefin wrasse
 Halichoeres pardaleocephalus (native)
 Halichoeres scapularis (native), Zigzag wrasse
 Halichoeres timorensis (native), Timor wrasse
 Halichoeres zeylonicus (native), Goldstripe wrasse
 Hemigymnus fasciatus (native), Barred thicklip
 Hemigymnus melapterus (native), Blackeye thicklip
 Hologymnosus annulatus (native), Ring wrasse
 Hologymnosus doliatus (native), Pastel ringwrasse
 Iniistius pavo (native), Peacock wrasse
 Labroides dimidiatus (native), Bluestreak cleaner wrasse
 Leptojulis cyanopleura (native), Shoulder-spot wrasse
 Macropharyngodon meleagris (native), Blackspotted wrasse
 Novaculichthys taeniourus (native), Rockmover wrasse
 Oxycheilinus bimaculatus (native), Two-spot wrasse
 Oxycheilinus digramma (native), Cheeklined wrasse
 Pseudocheilinus hexataenia (native), Sixline wrasse
 Pseudodax moluccanus (native), Chiseltooth wrasse
 Pteragogus flagellifer (native), Cocktail wrasse
 Stethojulis albovittata (native), Bluelined wrasse
 Stethojulis balteata (questionable), Belted wrasse
 Stethojulis strigiventer (native), Three-ribbon wrasse
 Stethojulis trilineata (native), Three-lined rainbowfish
 Thalassoma amblycephalum (native), Bluntheaded wrasse
 Thalassoma hardwicke (native), Sixbar wrasse
 Thalassoma jansenii (native), Jansen's wrasse
 Thalassoma lunare (native), Moon wrasse
 Thalassoma purpureum (native), Surge wrasse
 Thalassoma quinquevittatum (native), Fivestripe wrasse
 Xiphocheilus typus (native), Blue-banded wrasse
 Xyrichtys bimaculatus (native), Two-spot razorfish
 Xyrichtys cyanifrons (native)
 Xyrichtys dea (native)
 Xyrichtys pentadactylus (native), Fivefinger wrasse
 Xyrichtys rajagopalani (native)

Lactariidae (False trevallies)
 Lactarius lactarius (native) Big-jawed jumper, False trevally

Latidae (Lates perches)
 Lates calcarifer (native) Barramundi, Barramundi
 Psammoperca waigiensis (native) Waigeu seaperch, Waigieu seaperch

Leiognathidae (Slimys, slipmouths, or ponyfishes)
 Gazza achlamys (native), Smalltoothed ponyfish
 Gazza minuta (native) Toothpony, Toothpony
 Gazza rhombea (native), Rhomboid toothpony
 Leiognathus berbis (native), Berber ponyfish
 Leiognathus bindus (native) Orangefin ponyfish, Orangefin ponyfish
 Leiognathus blochii (native) Twoblotch ponyfish, Twoblotch ponyfish
 Leiognathus brevirostris (native), Shortnose ponyfish
 Leiognathus daura (native), Goldstripe ponyfish
 Leiognathus decorus (native) Shortnose ponyfish, Decorated ponyfish
 Leiognathus dussumieri (native), Dussumier's ponyfish
 Leiognathus elongatus (native), Slender ponyfish
 Leiognathus equulus (native) Common ponyfish, Common ponyfish
 Leiognathus fasciatus (native), Striped ponyfish
 Leiognathus leuciscus (native), Whipfin ponyfish
 Leiognathus lineolatus (native), Ornate ponyfish
 Leiognathus longispinis (questionable)
 Leiognathus smithursti (native), Smithurst's ponyfish
 Leiognathus splendens (native), Splendid ponyfish
 Leiognathus striatus (native)
 Secutor insidiator (native) Pugnose ponyfish, Pugnose ponyfish
 Secutor interruptus (native)
 Secutor ruconius (native) Deep pugnose ponyfish, Deep pugnose ponyfish

Lethrinidae (Emperors or scavengers)

 Gnathodentex aureolineatus (native), Striped large-eye bream
 Gymnocranius elongatus (native), Forktail large-eye bream
 Gymnocranius grandoculis (native), Blue-lined large-eye bream
 Gymnocranius griseus (native), Grey large-eye bream
 Lethrinus conchyliatus (native), Redaxil emperor
 Lethrinus erythracanthus (native), Orange-spotted emperor
 Lethrinus harak (native), Thumbprint emperor
 Lethrinus lentjan (native) Pig-face bream, Pink ear emperor
 Lethrinus mahsena (native), Sky emperor
 Lethrinus microdon (native), Smalltooth emperor
 Lethrinus miniatus (questionable), Trumpet emperor
 Lethrinus nebulosus (native), Spangled emperor
 Lethrinus obsoletus (native), Orange-striped emperor
 Lethrinus olivaceus (native), Longface emperor
 Lethrinus ornatus (native), Ornate emperor
 Lethrinus rubrioperculatus (native), Spotcheek emperor
 Lethrinus semicinctus (native), Black blotch emperor
 Lethrinus variegatus (native), Slender emperor
 Lethrinus xanthochilus (native), Yellowlip emperor
 Monotaxis grandoculis (native), Humpnose big-eye bream
 Wattsia mossambica (native), Mozambique large-eye bream

Lobotidae (Tripletails)
 Lobotes surinamensis (native) Tripletail, Atlantic tripletail

Lutjanidae (Snappers)

 Aphareus furca (native), Small toothed jobfish
 Aphareus rutilans (native), Rusty jobfish
 Aprion virescens (native), Green jobfish
 Apsilus fuscus (questionable), African forktail snapper
 Etelis carbunculus (native), Ruby snapper
 Etelis coruscans (native), Flame snapper
 Etelis radiosus (native), Scarlet snapper
 Lipocheilus carnolabrum (native), Tang's snapper
 Lutjanus argentimaculatus (native) River snapper, Mangrove red snapper
 Lutjanus bengalensis (native), Bengal snapper
 Lutjanus biguttatus (native), Two-spot banded snapper
 Lutjanus bohar (native), Two-spot red snapper
 Lutjanus carponotatus (native), Spanish flag snapper
 Lutjanus decussatus (native), Checkered snapper
 Lutjanus ehrenbergii (native) Blackspot snapper, Blackspot snapper
 Lutjanus erythropterus (native), Crimson snapper
 Lutjanus fulviflamma (native), Dory snapper
 Lutjanus fulvus (native), Blacktail snapper
 Lutjanus gibbus (native), Humpback red snapper
 Lutjanus guilcheri (native), Yellowfin red snapper
 Lutjanus johnii (native) John's snapper, John's snapper
 Lutjanus kasmira (native), Common bluestripe snapper
 Lutjanus lemniscatus (native), Yellowstreaked snapper
 Lutjanus lunulatus (native), Lunartail snapper
 Lutjanus lutjanus (native), Bigeye snapper
 Lutjanus madras (native), Indian snapper
 Lutjanus malabaricus (native), Malabar blood snapper
 Lutjanus monostigma (native), Onespot snapper
 Lutjanus quinquelineatus (native), Five-lined snapper
 Lutjanus rivulatus (native), Blubberlip snapper
 Lutjanus rufolineatus (questionable), Yellow-lined snapper
 Lutjanus russellii (native), Russell's snapper
 Lutjanus sanguineus (native), Humphead snapper
 Lutjanus sebae (native), Emperor red snapper
 Lutjanus vitta (native), Brownstripe red snapper
 Macolor niger (native), Black and white snapper
 Paracaesio sordida (native), Dirty ordure snapper
 Paracaesio xanthura (native), Yellowtail blue snapper
 Pinjalo lewisi (native), Slender pinjalo
 Pinjalo pinjalo (native), Pinjalo

 Pristipomoides filamentosus (native), Crimson jobfish
 Pristipomoides multidens (native), Goldbanded jobfish
 Pristipomoides sieboldii (native), Lavender jobfish
 Pristipomoides typus (questionable), Sharptooth jobfish
 Pristipomoides zonatus (native), Oblique-banded snapper

Malacanthidae (Tilefishes)
 Hoplolatilus fronticinctus (native), Pastel tilefish
 Malacanthus latovittatus (native), Blue blanquillo

Menidae (Moonfish)
 Mene maculata (native), Moonfish

Monodactylidae (Moonyfishes or fingerfishes)
 Monodactylus argenteus (native) Silvery moony, Silver moony
 Monodactylus falciformis (native) Full moony, Full moony

Mugilidae (Mullets)
 Crenimugil crenilabis (native), Fringelip mullet
 Liza carinata (native), Keeled mullet
 Liza klunzingeri (native), Klunzinger's mullet
 Liza macrolepis (native) Largescale mullet, Largescale mullet
 Liza mandapamensis (native), Indian mullet
 Liza melinoptera (native) Giantscale mullet, Otomebora mullet
 Liza parmata (questionable), Broad-mouthed mullet
 Liza parsia (native) Goldspot mullet, Gold-spot mullet
 Liza subviridis (native) Greenback mullet, Greenback mullet
 Liza tade (native) Tade mullet, Tade mullet
 Liza vaigiensis (native) Squaretail mullet, Squaretail mullet
 Mugil cephalus (native) Flathead mullet, Flathead mullet
 Oedalechilus labiosus (native), Hornlip mullet
 Rhinomugil corsula (native) Corsula mullet, Corsula
 Sicamugil cascasia (native) Yellowtail mullet, Yellowtail mullet
 Sicamugil hamiltonii (questionable) Burmese mullet, Burmese mullet
 Valamugil buchanani (native) Bluetail mullet, Bluetail mullet
 Valamugil cunnesius (native) Longarm mullet, Longarm mullet
 Valamugil seheli (native) Bluespot mullet, Bluespot mullet
 Valamugil speigleri (native) Speigler's mullet, Speigler's mullet

Mullidae (Goatfishes)
 Mulloidichthys flavolineatus (native), Yellowstripe goatfish
 Parupeneus barberinus (native), Dash-and-dot goatfish
 Parupeneus ciliatus (native), Whitesaddle goatfish
 Parupeneus cyclostomus (native), Goldsaddle goatfish
 Parupeneus heptacanthus (native), Cinnabar goatfish
 Parupeneus indicus (native), Indian goatfish
 Parupeneus macronemus (native), Longbarbel goatfish
 Parupeneus margaritatus (questionable), Pearly goatfish
 Parupeneus multifasciatus (native), Manybar goatfish
 Parupeneus pleurostigma (native), Sidespot goatfish
 Parupeneus trifasciatus (native), Doublebar goatfish
 Upeneus arge (native), Band-tail goatfish
 Upeneus japonicus (questionable), Bensasi goatfish
 Upeneus luzonius (questionable), Dark-barred goatfish
 Upeneus moluccensis (native), Goldband goatfish
 Upeneus sulphureus (native) Sunrise goatfish, Sulphur goatfish
 Upeneus sundaicus (native), Ochre-banded goatfish
 Upeneus taeniopterus (native), Finstripe goatfish
 Upeneus tragula (native), Freckled goatfish
 Upeneus vittatus (native), Yellowstriped goatfish

Nandidae (Asian leaffishes)
 Nandus nandus (native) Mottled nandus, Gangetic leaffish
 Pristolepis marginata (endemic) Malabar catopra, Malabar leaffish
 Pristolepis rubripinnis (endemic) 
 Pristolepis pentacantha (endemic) Aattuchemballi

Nemipteridae (Threadfin breams, Whiptail breams)

 Nemipterus bipunctatus (native), Delagoa threadfin bream
 Nemipterus furcosus (native), Fork-tailed threadfin bream
 Nemipterus hexodon (native), Ornate threadfin bream
 Nemipterus japonicus (native), Japanese threadfin bream
 Nemipterus marginatus (questionable), Red filament threadfin bream
 Nemipterus mesoprion (questionable), Mauvelip threadfin bream
 Nemipterus nematophorus (native), Doublewhip threadfin bream
 Nemipterus nemurus (questionable), Redspine threadfin bream
 Nemipterus peronii (native), Notchedfin threadfin bream
 Nemipterus randalli (native), Randall's threadfin bream
 Nemipterus zysron (native), Slender threadfin bream
 Parascolopsis aspinosa (native), Smooth dwarf monocle bream
 Parascolopsis boesemani (endemic), Redfin dwarf monocle bream
 Parascolopsis eriomma (native), Rosy dwarf monocle bream
 Parascolopsis inermis (native), Unarmed dwarf monocle bream
 Parascolopsis townsendi (native), Scaly dwarf monocle bream
 Pentapodus setosus (questionable), Butterfly whiptail
 Scolopsis aurata (native), Yellowstripe monocle bream
 Scolopsis bilineata (native), Two-lined monocle bream
 Scolopsis bimaculatus (native), Thumbprint monocle bream
 Scolopsis ciliata (native), Saw-jawed monocle bream
 Scolopsis frenatus (native), Bridled monocle bream
 Scolopsis ghanam (native), Arabian monocle bream
 Scolopsis lineata (native), Striped monocle bream
 Scolopsis margaritifera (questionable), Pearly monocle bream
 Scolopsis taeniatus (native), Black-streaked monocle bream
 Scolopsis taenioptera (questionable), Lattice monocle bream
 Scolopsis vosmeri (native), Whitecheek monocle bream
 Scolopsis xenochrous (native), Oblique-barred monocle bream

Nomeidae (Driftfishes)
 Cubiceps squamiceps (native), Indian driftfish
 Psenes cyanophrys (native), Freckled driftfish

Osphronemidae (Gouramies)
 Belontia signata (questionable) Ceylonese combtail
 Colisa fasciata (native) Giant gourami, banded gourami, Indian gourami
 Colisa lalia (native) Dwarf gourami
 Ctenops nobilis (native) Indian paradisefish, frail gourami
 Osphronemus goramy (introduced) Giant gouramy
 Parasphaerichthys ocellatus (questionable) Eyespot gourami
 Pseudosphromenus cupanus (native) Day's paradise fish, spiketail paradisefish
 Pseudosphromenus dayi (endemic)
 Trichogaster chuna (native) Sunset gourami, honey gourami

Pempheridae (Sweepers)
 Parapriacanthus ransonneti (native), Pigmy sweeper
 Pempheris mangula (native), Black-edged sweeper
 Pempheris molucca (questionable)
 Pempheris oualensis (native), Silver sweeper
 Pempheris vanicolensis (native), Vanikoro sweeper

Percophidae (Duckbills)
 Bembrops caudimacula (native)
 Bembrops platyrhynchus (native), Natal duckbill

Pinguipedidae (Sandperches)
 Parapercis alboguttata (native), Whitespot sandsmelt
 Parapercis clathrata (questionable), Latticed sandperch
 Parapercis hexophtalma (native), Speckled sandperch
 Parapercis maculata (native), Harlequin sandperch
 Parapercis pulchella (native), Harlequin sandsmelt
 Parapercis punctata (native)
 Parapercis quadrispinosa (native)
 Parapercis tetracantha (native), Reticulated sandperch

Plesiopidae (Roundheads)
 Acanthoplesiops indicus (native), Scottie
 Plesiops coeruleolineatus (native), Crimsontip longfin
 Plesiops corallicola (native), Bluegill longfin

Polynemidae (Threadfins)
 Eleutheronema tetradactylum (native) White salmon, Fourfinger threadfin
 Filimanus heptadactyla (native) Sevenfinger threadfin, Sevenfinger threadfin
 Filimanus similis (native)
 Filimanus xanthonema (native), Yellowthread threadfin
 Leptomelanosoma indicum (native) Indian threadfin, Indian threadfin
 Polydactylus macrochir (native), King threadfin
 Polydactylus microstomus (native), Small-mouthed threadfin
 Polydactylus mullani (native)
 Polydactylus multiradiatus (questionable), Australian threadfin
 Polydactylus plebeius (native), Striped threadfin
 Polydactylus sexfilis (native), Sixfinger threadfin
 Polydactylus sextarius (native) Blackspot threadfin, Blackspot threadfin
 Polynemus dubius (questionable) Borneo threadfin, Eastern paradise fish
 Polynemus paradiseus (native) Paradise threadfin, Paradise threadfin

Pomacanthidae (Angelfishes)
 Apolemichthys xanthurus (native), Yellowtail angelfish
 Centropyge bicolor (native), Bicolor angelfish
 Centropyge eibli (native), Blacktail angelfish
 Centropyge multispinis (native), Dusky angelfish
 Chaetodontoplus melanosoma (native), Black-velvet angelfish
 Pomacanthus annularis (native) Ringed angle fish, Bluering angelfish
 Pomacanthus imperator (native), Emperor angelfish
 Pomacanthus semicirculatus (native), Semicircle angelfish

Pomacentridae (Damselfishes)
 Abudefduf bengalensis (native), Bengal sergeant
 Abudefduf saxatilis (misidentification), Sergeant major
 Abudefduf septemfasciatus (native), Banded sergeant
 Abudefduf sexfasciatus (native), Scissortail sergeant
 Abudefduf sordidus (native), Blackspot sergeant
 Abudefduf vaigiensis (native), Indo-Pacific sergeant
 Amphiprion bicinctus (questionable), Twoband anemonefish
 Amphiprion chrysogaster (questionable), Mauritian anemonefish
 Amphiprion ephippium (native), Saddle anemonefish
 Amphiprion frenatus (questionable), Tomato clownfish
 Amphiprion nigripes (questionable), Maldive anemonefish
 Amphiprion ocellaris (native), Clown anemonefish
 Amphiprion percula (questionable), Orange clownfish
 Amphiprion polymnus (questionable), Saddleback clownfish
 Amphiprion sebae (native), Sebae anemonefish
 Cheiloprion labiatus (native), Big-lip damsel
 Chromis caerulea (native), Green chromis
 Chromis chrysura (questionable), Stout chromis
 Chromis dimidiata (native), Chocolatedip chromis
 Chromis opercularis (native), Doublebar chromis
 Chromis ternatensis (native), Ternate chromis
 Chromis viridis (native), Blue green damselfish
 Chromis weberi (native), Weber's chromis
 Chrysiptera biocellata (native), Twinspot damselfish
 Chrysiptera brownriggii (native), Surge damselfish
 Chrysiptera cyanea (native), Sapphire devil
 Chrysiptera glauca (native), Grey demoiselle
 Chrysiptera unimaculata (native), Onespot demoiselle
 Dascyllus aruanus (native), Whitetail dascyllus
 Dascyllus reticulatus (questionable), Reticulate dascyllus
 Dascyllus trimaculatus (native), Threespot dascyllus
 Dischistodus perspicillatus (native), White damsel
 Dischistodus prosopotaenia (native), Honey-head damsel
 Lepidozygus tapeinosoma (native), Fusilier damselfish
 Neopomacentrus taeniurus (native), Freshwater demoiselle
 Plectroglyphidodon dickii (native), Blackbar devil
 Plectroglyphidodon lacrymatus (native), Whitespotted devil
 Plectroglyphidodon leucozonus (native), Singlebar devil
 Pomacentrus albicaudatus (questionable), Whitefin damsel
 Pomacentrus brachialis (questionable), Charcoal damsel
 Pomacentrus littoralis (questionable), Smoky damsel
 Pomacentrus pavo (native), Sapphire damsel
 Premnas biaculeatus (native), Spinecheek anemonefish
 Pristotis obtusirostris (native), Gulf damselfish
 Stegastes albifasciatus (native), Whitebar gregory
 Stegastes lividus (native), Blunt snout gregory
 Stegastes nigricans (native), Dusky farmerfish
 Stegastes obreptus (native), Western gregory

Pomatomidae (Bluefishes)
 Pomatomus saltatrix (native), Bluefish

Priacanthidae (Bigeyes or catalufas)
 Heteropriacanthus cruentatus (native), Glasseye
 Priacanthus hamrur (native), Moontail bullseye
 Priacanthus macracanthus (native), Red bigeye
 Priacanthus prolixus (native), Elongate bulleye
 Priacanthus tayenus (native), Purple-spotted bigeye
 Pristigenys niphonia (native), Japanese bigeye

Pseudochromidae (Dottybacks)
 Congrogadus subducens (native), Carpet eel-blenny
 Halidesmus thomaseni (native), Thomasen's snakelet
 Pseudochromis caudalis (native)
 Pseudochromis tapeinosoma (native), Blackmargin dottyback

Ptereleotridae 
 Ptereleotris evides (native), Blackfin dartfish
 Ptereleotris microlepis (native), Blue gudgeon

Rachycentridae (Cobia)
 Rachycentron canadum (native), Cobia

Scaridae (Parrotfishes)
 Calotomus spinidens (native), Spinytooth parrotfish
 Calotomus viridescens (questionable), Viridescent parrotfish
 Chlorurus enneacanthus (native), Captain parrotfish
 Chlorurus gibbus (native), Heavybeak parrotfish
 Chlorurus oedema (native), Knothead parrotfish
 Chlorurus sordidus (native), Daisy parrotfish
 Hipposcarus harid (native), Candelamoa parrotfish
 Leptoscarus vaigiensis (native), Marbled parrotfish
 Scarus ghobban (native), Blue-barred parrotfish
 Scarus globiceps (native), Globehead parrotfish
 Scarus niger (native), Dusky parrotfish
 Scarus prasiognathos (native), Singapore parrotfish
 Scarus psittacus (native), Common parrotfish
 Scarus quoyi (native), Quoy's parrotfish
 Scarus rubroviolaceus (native), Ember parrotfish
 Scarus russelii (native), Eclipse parrotfish
 Scarus scaber (native), Fivesaddle parrotfish
 Scarus tricolor (native), Tricolour parrotfish

Scatophagidae (Scats)
 Scatophagus argus (native) Spotted scat, Spotted scat

Schindleriidae 
 Schindleria pietschmanni (questionable)
 Schindleria praematura (questionable), Schindler's fish

Sciaenidae (Drums or croakers)
 Argyrosomus amoyensis (native), Amoy croaker
 Argyrosomus hololepidotus (misidentification), Madagascar meagre
 Argyrosomus japonicus (native), Japanese meagre
 Atrobucca alcocki (native)
 Atrobucca antonbruun (native)
 Atrobucca nibe (native), Longfin kob
 Atrobucca trewavasae (native)
 Bahaba chaptis (native) Chaptis bahaba, Chaptis bahaba
 Chrysochir aureus (native), Reeve's croaker
 Daysciaena albida (native) Two-bearded croaker, Bengal corvina
 Dendrophysa russelii (native) Goatee croaker, Goatee croaker
 Johnius amblycephalus (native), Bearded croaker
 Johnius belangerii (native) Belanger's croaker, Belanger's croaker
 Johnius borneensis (native), Sharpnose hammer croaker
 Johnius carouna (native) Caroun croaker, Caroun croaker
 Johnius carutta (native) Karut croaker, Karut croaker
 Johnius coitor (native) Coitor croaker, Coitor croaker
 Johnius dussumieri (native) Sharptooth hammer croaker, Sin croaker
 Johnius elongatus (native), Spindle croaker
 Johnius gangeticus (endemic) Gangetic bola
 Johnius glaucus (native), Pale spotfin croaker
 Johnius macropterus (native), Largefin croaker
 Johnius macrorhynus (native), Big-snout croaker
 Johnius mannarensis (native), Mannar croaker
 Johnius plagiostoma (native), Large-eye croaker
 Kathala axillaris (native), Kathala croaker
 Macrospinosa cuja (native) Cuja bola
 Nibea chui (questionable), Chu's croaker
 Nibea maculata (native), Blotched croaker
 Nibea soldado (native), Soldier croaker
 Otolithes cuvieri (native), Lesser tigertooth croaker
 Otolithes ruber (native), Tiger-toothed croaker
 Otolithoides biauritus (native) Bronze croaker, Bronze croaker
 Otolithoides pama (native) Pama, Pama croaker
 Panna heterolepis (native) Hooghly croaker, Hooghly croaker
 Panna microdon (misidentification) Panna croaker, Panna croaker
 Paranibea semiluctuosa (native), Half-mourning croaker
 Pennahia anea (native), Greyfin croaker
 Pennahia macrocephalus (questionable), Big-head pennah croaker
 Pennahia ovata (native)
 Protonibea diacanthus (native) Spotted croaker, Blackspotted croaker
 Pterotolithus maculatus (native) Blotched tiger-toothed croaker, Blotched tiger-toothed croaker
 Umbrina canariensis (native), Canary drum

Scombridae (Mackerels, tunas, bonitos)

 Acanthocybium solandri (native), Wahoo
 Auxis rochei rochei (native), Bullet tuna
 Auxis thazard thazard (native), Frigate tuna
 Euthynnus affinis (native) Mackerel tuna, Kawakawa
 Grammatorcynus bicarinatus (questionable), Shark mackerel
 Gymnosarda unicolor (native) Dogtooth tuna, Dogtooth tuna
 Katsuwonus pelamis (native) Skiy jack, Skipjack tuna
 Rastrelliger brachysoma (native), Short mackerel
 Rastrelliger faughni (native), Island mackerel
 Rastrelliger kanagurta (native) Rake gillat mackerel, Indian mackerel
 Sarda orientalis (native) Oriental bonito, Striped bonito
 Scomber japonicus (native), Chub mackerel
 Scomberomorus commerson (native) King seer, Narrow-barred Spanish mackerel
 Scomberomorus guttatus (native) Spotted Spanish mackerel, Indo-Pacific king mackerel
 Scomberomorus koreanus (native), Korean seerfish
 Scomberomorus lineolatus (native) Streaked seer, Streaked seerfish
 Thunnus alalunga (native), Albacore
 Thunnus albacares (native) Yellow fin tuna, Yellowfin tuna
 Thunnus obesus (native), Bigeye tuna
 Thunnus orientalis (native), Pacific bluefin tuna
 Thunnus tonggol (native) Blue fin tuna, Longtail tuna

Serranidae (Sea basses: groupers and fairy basslets)

 Aethaloperca rogaa (native), Redmouth grouper
 Anyperodon leucogrammicus (native), Slender grouper
 Aporops bilinearis (native), Blotched podge
 Aulacocephalus temminckii (native), Goldribbon soapfish
 Cephalopholis argus (native) Balufana, Peacock hind
 Cephalopholis aurantia (native), Golden hind
 Cephalopholis boenak (native), Chocolate hind
 Cephalopholis formosa (native), Bluelined hind
 Cephalopholis leopardus (native), Leopard hind
 Cephalopholis miniata (native), Coral hind
 Cephalopholis sexmaculata (native), Sixblotch hind
 Cephalopholis sonnerati (native), Tomato hind
 Cephalopholis urodeta (native), Darkfin hind
 Chelidoperca investigatoris (native)
 Cromileptes altivelis (native), Humpback grouper
 Diploprion bifasciatum (native), Barred soapfish
 Epinephelus areolatus (native), Areolate grouper
 Epinephelus bleekeri (native), Duskytail grouper
 Epinephelus chabaudi (native), Moustache grouper
 Epinephelus chlorostigma (native), Brownspotted grouper
 Epinephelus coeruleopunctatus (native), Whitespotted grouper
 Epinephelus coioides (native), Orange-spotted grouper
 Epinephelus corallicola (questionable), Coral grouper
 Epinephelus diacanthus (native), Spinycheek grouper
 Epinephelus epistictus (native), Dotted grouper
 Epinephelus erythrurus (native), Cloudy grouper
 Epinephelus fasciatus (native), Blacktip grouper
 Epinephelus faveatus (native), Barred-chest grouper
 Epinephelus flavocaeruleus (native), Blue and yellow grouper
 Epinephelus fuscoguttatus (native), Brown-marbled grouper
 Epinephelus hexagonatus (native), Starspotted grouper
 Epinephelus lanceolatus (native) Bridlebass, Giant grouper
 Epinephelus latifasciatus (native), Striped grouper
 Epinephelus longispinis (native), Longspine grouper
 Epinephelus macrospilos (native), Snubnose grouper
 Epinephelus maculatus (native), Highfin grouper
 Epinephelus malabaricus (native) Malabar rockcod, Malabar grouper
 Epinephelus marginatus (questionable), Dusky grouper
 Epinephelus melanostigma (native), One-blotch grouper
 Epinephelus merra (native), Honeycomb grouper
 Epinephelus morrhua (native), Comet grouper
 Epinephelus octofasciatus (native), Eightbar grouper
 Epinephelus poecilonotus (native), Dot-dash grouper
 Epinephelus polylepis (native), Smallscaled grouper
 Epinephelus polyphekadion (native), Camouflage grouper
 Epinephelus quoyanus (native), Longfin grouper
 Epinephelus radiatus (native), Oblique-banded grouper
 Epinephelus rivulatus (native), Halfmoon grouper
 Epinephelus spilotoceps (native), Foursaddle grouper
 Epinephelus stoliczkae (native), Epaulet grouper
 Epinephelus summana (questionable), Summan grouper
 Epinephelus tauvina (native) Greasy rockcod, Greasy grouper
 Epinephelus tukula (native), Potato grouper
 Epinephelus undulosus (native), Wavy-lined grouper
 Grammistes sexlineatus (native), Sixline soapfish
 Plectropomus areolatus (native), Squaretail coralgrouper
 Plectropomus maculatus (questionable), Spotted coralgrouper
 Pogonoperca punctata (native), Spotted soapfish
 Pseudanthias cichlops (questionable)
 Pseudanthias conspicuus (native)
 Pseudanthias cooperi (native), Red-bar anthias
 Pseudanthias squamipinnis (native), Sea goldie
 Pseudogramma polyacanthum (native), Honeycomb podge
 Variola louti (native), Yellow-edged lyretail

Siganidae (Rabbitfishes)
 Siganus argenteus (native), Streamlined spinefoot
 Siganus canaliculatus (native), White-spotted spinefoot
 Siganus corallinus (native), Blue-spotted spinefoot
 Siganus fuscescens (native), Mottled spinefoot
 Siganus guttatus (native), Orange-spotted spinefoot
 Siganus javus (native), Streaked spinefoot
 Siganus lineatus (native), Golden-lined spinefoot
 Siganus magnificus (questionable), Magnificent rabbitfish
 Siganus puelloides (native), Blackeye rabbitfish
 Siganus punctatus (questionable), Goldspotted spinefoot
 Siganus spinus (native), Little spinefoot
 Siganus stellatus (native), Brownspotted spinefoot
 Siganus vermiculatus (native), Vermiculated spinefoot
 Siganus virgatus (native), Barhead spinefoot

Sillaginidae (Smelt-whitings)
 Sillaginopsis panijus (native) Gangetic whiting, Flathead sillago
 Sillago aeolus (native), Oriental sillago
 Sillago argentifasciata (questionable), Silver-banded sillago
 Sillago chondropus (native), Clubfoot sillago
 Sillago indica (endemic), Indian sillago
 Sillago ingenuua (native), Bay sillago
 Sillago intermedius (native), Intermediate sillago
 Sillago lutea (native), Mud sillago
 Sillago macrolepis (questionable), Large-scale sillago
 Sillago maculata (questionable), Trumpeter sillago
 Sillago parvisquamis (questionable), Small-scale sillago
 Sillago sihama (native) Silver sillago, Silver sillago
 Sillago soringa (endemic), Soringa sillago
 Sillago vincenti (endemic) Estuarine whiting, Vincent's sillago

Sparidae (Porgies)
 Acanthopagrus berda (native) Riverbream, Picnic seabream
 Acanthopagrus bifasciatus (native), Twobar seabream
 Acanthopagrus latus (native) Yellow seabream, Yellowfin seabream
 Argyrops spinifer (native), King soldierbream
 Cheimerius nufar (native), Santer seabream
 Crenidens crenidens (native) Karanteen, Karenteen seabream
 Diplodus noct (questionable), Red Sea seabream
 Diplodus sargus kotschyi (native), One spot seabream
 Rhabdosargus sarba (native) Natal stumpnose, Goldlined seabream
 Sparidentex hasta (native), Sobaity seabream

Sphyraenidae (Barracudas)
 Sphyraena acutipinnis (native), Sharpfin barracuda
 Sphyraena barracuda (native), Great barracuda
 Sphyraena chrysotaenia (native), Yellowstripe barracuda
 Sphyraena flavicauda (native), Yellowtail barracuda
 Sphyraena forsteri (native), Bigeye barracuda
 Sphyraena jello (native), Pickhandle barracuda
 Sphyraena novaehollandiae (questionable), Australian barracuda
 Sphyraena obtusata (native), Obtuse barracuda
 Sphyraena putnamae (native) Sawtooth barracuda, Sawtooth barracuda
 Sphyraena qenie (native), Blackfin barracuda
 Pampus argenteus (native) Silver pomfret, Silver pomfret
 Pampus chinensis (native) Chinese pomfret, Chinese silver pomfret

Symphysanodontidae 
 Symphysanodon andersoni (native)

Terapontidae (Grunters or tigerperches)
 Pelates quadrilineatus (native) Fourlined terapon, Fourlined terapon
 Pelates sexlineatus (questionable), Six-lined trumpeter
 Terapon jarbua (native) Jarbua terapon, Jarbua terapon
 Terapon puta (native) Smallscale terapon, Small-scaled terapon
 Terapon theraps (native) Banded grunter, Largescaled therapon

Toxotidae (Archerfishes)
 Toxotes chatareus (native) Spotted archerfish, Largescale archerfish
 Toxotes jaculatrix (native) Banded archerfish, Banded archerfish

Trichiuridae (Cutlassfishes)
 Benthodesmus oligoradiatus (native), Sparse-rayed frostfish
 Benthodesmus tenuis (questionable), Slender frostfish
 Eupleurogrammus glossodon (native), Longtooth hairtail
 Eupleurogrammus muticus (native), Smallhead hairtail
 Lepidopus caudatus (questionable), Silver scabbardfish
 Lepturacanthus pantului (native) Coromandal ribbonfish, Coromandel hairtail
 Lepturacanthus savala (native) Small headed ribbon fish, Savalani hairtail
 Trichiurus auriga (native), Pearly hairtail
 Trichiurus gangeticus (native) Gangetic ribbonfish, Ganges hairtail
 Trichiurus lepturus (native), Largehead hairtail
 Trichiurus russelli (native), Short-tailed hairtail

Trichonotidae (Sanddivers)
 Trichonotus cyclograptus (native)
 Trichonotus setiger (native), Spotted sand-diver

Tripterygiidae (Threefin blennies)
 Enneapterygius elegans (native), Hourglass triplefin
 Enneapterygius fasciatus (native)
 Enneapterygius pusillus (native), Highcrest triplefin
 Helcogramma ellioti (native)
 Helcogramma gymnauchen (questionable), Red-finned triplefin
 Helcogramma trigloides (questionable)

Uranoscopidae (Stargazers)
 Ichthyscopus lebeck (native), Longnosed stargazer
 Uranoscopus crassiceps (native)
 Uranoscopus guttatus (native)

Xenisthmidae 
 Kraemericus smithi (endemic)

Xiphiidae (Swordfish)
 Xiphias gladius (native), Swordfish

Zanclidae (Moorish idol)
 Zanclus cornutus (native), Moorish idol

Pleuronectiformes

Bothidae (Lefteye flounders)
 Arnoglossus aspilos (native), Spotless lefteye flounder
 Arnoglossus tapeinosoma (native)
 Bothus leopardinus (questionable), Pacific leopard flounder
 Bothus mancus (native), Flowery flounder
 Bothus myriaster (native), Indo-Pacific oval flounder
 Bothus pantherinus (native), Leopard flounder
 Chascanopsetta lugubris (native), Pelican flounder
 Crossorhombus valderostratus (native), Broadbrow flounder
 Engyprosopon cocosensis (native), Cocos Island flounder
 Engyprosopon grandisquama (native), Largescale flounder
 Grammatobothus polyophthalmus (native), Threespot flounder
 Psettina brevirictis (native)

Citharidae (Citharids)
 Brachypleura novaezeelandiae (native), Yellow-dabbled flounder

Cynoglossidae (Tonguefishes)
 Cynoglossus arel (native), Largescale tonguesole
 Cynoglossus bilineatus (native), Fourlined tonguesole
 Cynoglossus carpenteri (native), Hooked tonguesole
 Cynoglossus cynoglossus (native) Gangetic tonguesole, Bengal tongue sole
 Cynoglossus dispar (native), Roundhead toungesole
 Cynoglossus dubius (native), Carrot tonguesole
 Cynoglossus itinus (questionable)
 Cynoglossus kopsii (native), Shortheaded tonguesole
 Cynoglossus lachneri (questionable), Lachner's tonguesole
 Cynoglossus lida (native) Shoulder spot tongue, Roughscale tonguesole
 Cynoglossus lingua (native) Long tonguesole, Long tongue sole
 Cynoglossus macrostomus (native) Malabar-sole, Malabar tonguesole
 Cynoglossus monopus (native)
 Cynoglossus puncticeps (native) Speckled toungesole, Speckled tonguesole
 Cynoglossus semifasciatus (native) Malabar sole, Bengal tongue-sole
 Paraplagusia bilineata (native) Fingerlip tonguesole, Doublelined tonguesole
 Paraplagusia blochii (native), Bloch's tonguesole
 Symphurus trifasciatus (native), Threeband tonguesole

Paralichthyidae (Large-tooth flounders)
 Cephalopsetta ventrocellatus (native)
 Pseudorhombus arsius (native) Largetooth flounder, Largetooth flounder
 Pseudorhombus dupliciocellatus (native), Ocellated flounder
 Pseudorhombus elevatus (native), Deep flounder
 Pseudorhombus javanicus (native), Javan flounder
 Pseudorhombus malayanus (native), Malayan flounder
 Pseudorhombus micrognathus (native)
 Pseudorhombus natalensis (native), Natal flounders
 Pseudorhombus triocellatus (native) Three spot flounder, Three spotted flounder

Pleuronectidae (Righteye flounders)
 Marleyella bicolorata (native), Comb flounder
 Poecilopsetta colorata (native), Coloured righteye flounder
 Poecilopsetta praelonga (native), Alcock's narrow-body righteye flounder

Psettodidae (Psettodids)

 Psettodes erumei (native) Indian halibut, Indian spiny turbot

Samaridae 
 Samaris cristatus (native), Cockatoo righteye flounder
 Samariscus longimanus (native), Longfinned flounder

Soleidae (Soles)
 Aesopia cornuta (native), Unicorn sole
 Brachirus macrolepis (native)
 Brachirus orientalis (native) Oriental-sole, Oriental sole
 Brachirus pan (native) Pan sole, Pan sole
 Brachirus panoides (questionable)
 Heteromycteris oculus (native), Eyed sole
 Liachirus melanospilos (native)
 Pardachirus marmoratus (native), Finless sole
 Pardachirus pavoninus (native), Peacock sole
 Solea elongata (native) Elongate sole, Elongate sole
 Solea heinii (native)
 Solea ovata (native), Ovate sole
 Soleichthys heterorhinos (native)
 Synaptura albomaculata (native) Kaup's sole, Kaup's sole
 Synaptura commersonnii (native), Commerson's sole
 Zebrias altipinnis (native)
 Zebrias annandalei (native)
 Zebrias japonica (questionable), Wavyband sole
 Zebrias keralensis (native)
 Zebrias maculosus (native)
 Zebrias quagga (native), Fringefin zebra sole
 Zebrias synapturoides (native), Indian zebra sole
 Zebrias zebra (questionable), Zebra sole

Polymixiiformes

Polymixiidae (Beardfishes)
 Polymixia fusca (native)
 Polymixia japonica (questionable), Silver eye

Pristiformes

Pristidae (Sawfishes)
 Anoxypristis cuspidata (native), Knifetooth sawfish
 Pristis microdon (native) Smalltooth sawfish, Largetooth sawfish
 Pristis pectinata (native) Smooth-tooth sawfish, Smalltooth sawfish
 Pristis pristis (questionable), Common sawfish
 Pristis zijsron (native), Longcomb sawfish

Rajiformes

Dasyatidae (Stingrays)
 Dasyatis bennetti (native), Bennett's stingray
 Dasyatis kuhlii (native), Bluespotted stingray
 Dasyatis microps (native), Smalleye stingray
 Dasyatis pastinaca (questionable), Common stingray
 Dasyatis zugei (native) Pale-edged stingray, Pale-edged stingray
 Himantura alcockii (native), Pale-spot whip ray
 Himantura bleekeri (native) Whiptail stingray, Bleeker's whipray
 Himantura chaophraya (questionable), Freshwater whipray
 Himantura fai (native), Pink whipray
 Himantura fluviatilis (native) Gangetic stingray, Ganges stingray
 Himantura gerrardi (native), Sharpnose stingray
 Himantura imbricata (native) Scaly stingray, Scaly whipray
 Himantura jenkinsii (native), Pointed-nose stingray
 Himantura marginatus (native) Blackedged stingray, Blackedge whipray
 Himantura uarnak (native) Leopard stingray, Honeycomb stingray
 Himantura undulata (native), Leopard whipray
 Himantura walga (questionable), Dwarf whipray
 Pastinachus sephen (native) Feathertail stingray, Cowtail stingray
 Taeniura lymma (native), Bluespotted ribbontail ray
 Taeniura meyeni (native), Blotched fantail ray
 Urogymnus asperrimus (native), Porcupine ray

Gymnuridae (Butterfly rays)
 Aetoplatea tentaculata (native), Tentacled butterfly ray
 Aetoplatea zonura (native), Zonetail butterfly ray
 Gymnura japonica (questionable), Japanese butterflyray
 Gymnura micrura (questionable), Smooth butterfly ray
 Gymnura poecilura (native), Longtail butterfly ray

Myliobatidae (Eagle and manta rays)
 Aetobatus flagellum (native) Plain eagleray, Longheaded eagle ray
 Aetobatus guttatus (native), Sharpwing eagle ray
 Aetobatus narinari (native) Spotted eagleray, Spotted eagle ray
 Aetobatus ocellatus (native)
 Aetomylaeus maculatus (native), Mottled eagle ray
 Aetomylaeus milvus (native)
 Aetomylaeus nichofii (native) Nieuhof's eagle ray, Banded eagle ray
 Manta birostris (native), Giant manta
 Mobula eregoodootenkee (native), Pygmy devilray
 Mobula japanica (native), Spinetail mobula
 Mobula kuhlii (native), Shortfin devil ray
 Mobula mobular (questionable), Devil fish
 Mobula thurstoni (native), Smooth-tail mobula
 Rhinoptera adspersa (native), Rough cownose ray
 Rhinoptera javanica (native), Javanese cownose ray

Plesiobatidae (Deepwater stingray)
 Plesiobatis daviesi (native), Deepwater stingray

Rajidae (Skates)
 Dipturus johannisdavisi (native), Travancore skate
 Fenestraja mamillidens (native), Prickly skate
 Okamejei powelli (native), Indian ringed skate

Rhinobatidae (Guitarfishes)
 Rhina ancylostoma (native), Bowmouth guitarfish
 Rhinobatos annandalei (native) Annandale's shovelnose ray, Annandale's guitarfish
 Rhinobatos granulatus (native), Sharpnose guitarfish
 Rhinobatos halavi (native), Halavi's guitarfish
 Rhinobatos lionotus (native) Norman's shovelnose ray, Smoothback guitarfish
 Rhinobatos obtusus (native), Widenose guitarfish
 Rhinobatos thouin (native), Clubnose guitarfish
 Rhinobatos typus (questionable), Giant shovelnose ray
 Rhinobatos variegatus (native), Stripenose guitarfish
 Rhynchobatus djiddensis (native), Giant guitarfish
 Zanobatus schoenleinii (questionable), Striped panray

Salmoniformes

Salmonidae (Salmonids)
 Oncorhynchus mykiss (introduced) Rainbow trout, Rainbow trout
 Oncorhynchus nerka (questionable) Sockeye salmon, Sockeye salmon
 Salmo trutta fario (introduced) Brown trout, Brown trout
 Salmo trutta trutta (introduced), Sea trout
 Salvelinus fontinalis (introduced) Brook trout, Brook trout

Scorpaeniformes

Apistidae 
 Apistus carinatus (native), Ocellated waspfish

Aploactinidae (Velvetfishes)
 Acanthosphex leurynnis (native)
 Cocotropus roseus (native)

Bembridae (Deepwater flatheads)
 Bembras japonica (questionable)

Caracanthidae (Orbicular velvetfishes)
 Caracanthus maculatus (native), Spotted coral croucher
 Caracanthus unipinna (native), Pygmy coral croucher

Dactylopteridae (Flying gurnards)
 Dactyloptena gilberti (native)
 Dactyloptena macracantha (native), Spotwing flying gurnard
 Dactyloptena orientalis (native), Oriental flying gurnard
 Dactyloptena peterseni (native), Starry flying gurnard

Peristediidae (Armored searobins or armored gurnards)
 Peristedion investigatoris (native)
 Satyrichthys adeni (native)

Platycephalidae (Flatheads)
 Cociella crocodila (native) Crocodile flathead, Crocodile flathead
 Eurycephalus carbunculus (native), Papillose flathead
 Grammoplites scaber (native) Rough flathead, Rough flathead
 Grammoplites suppositus (native), Spotfin flathead
 Inegocia japonica (native), Japanese flathead
 Kumococius rodericensis (native), Spiny flathead
 Platycephalus indicus (native) Bartail flathead, Bartail flathead
 Rogadius asper (native), Olive-tailed flathead
 Rogadius serratus (native), Serrated flathead
 Sorsogona tuberculata (native), Tuberculated flathead
 Suggrundus macracanthus (native), Large-spined flathead
 Sunagocia otaitensis (native), Fringelip flathead
 Thysanophrys celebica (native), Celebes flathead
 Thysanophrys chiltonae (native), Longsnout flathead

Scorpaenidae (Scorpionfishes or rockfishes)
 Brachypterois serrulata (native)
 Dendrochirus brachypterus (native), Shortfin turkeyfish
 Ebosia falcata (native)
 Parascorpaena picta (questionable), Northern scorpionfish
 Pteroidichthys amboinensis (native)
 Pterois antennata (native), Broadbarred firefish
 Pterois mombasae (native), Frillfin turkeyfish
 Pterois radiata (native), Radial firefish
 Pterois russelii (native) Russell's fire fish, Plaintail turkeyfish
 Pterois volitans (native), Red lionfish
 Scorpaenodes guamensis (native), Guam scorpionfish
 Scorpaenodes muciparus (native)
 Scorpaenodes parvipinnis (native), Lowfin scorpionfish
 Scorpaenopsis cirrosa (questionable), Weedy stingfish
 Scorpaenopsis gibbosa (native), Humpback scorpionfish
 Sebastapistes nuchalis (native)
 Sebastapistes strongia (native), Barchin scorpionfish
 Taenianotus triacanthus (native), Leaf scorpionfish

Setarchidae 
 Setarches guentheri (native), Deepwater scorpionfish

Synanceiidae (Stonefishes)
 Choridactylus multibarbus (native), Orangebanded stingfish
 Inimicus caledonicus (native), Chinese ghoul
 Inimicus sinensis (native), Spotted ghoul
 Minous dempsterae (native), Obliquebanded stingfish
 Minous inermis (native), Alcock's scorpionfish

 Minous monodactylus (native) Grey goblin fish, Grey stingfish
 Synanceia horrida (native), Estuarine stonefish
 Synanceia verrucosa (native), Stonefish
 Trachicephalus uranoscopus (native), Stargazing stonefish

Tetrarogidae (Wasp fishes)
 Ocosia ramaraoi (native)
 Paracentropogon longispinis (native), Wispy waspfish
 Pseudovespicula dracaena (native), Draco waspfish
 Richardsonichthys leucogaster (native), Whiteface waspfish
 Snyderina guentheri (native), Günther's waspfish
 Tetraroge niger (native)

Triglidae (Searobins)
 Lepidotrigla bispinosa (native), Bullhorn gurnard
 Lepidotrigla faurei (native), Scalybreast gurnard
 Lepidotrigla longipinnis (native)
 Lepidotrigla omanensis (native), Oman gurnard
 Pterygotrigla hemisticta (native), Blackspotted gurnard

Siluriformes

Amblycipitidae (Torrent catfishes)
 Amblyceps laticeps (native)
 Amblyceps mangois (native) Indian torrent catfish, Indian torrent catfish
 Amblyceps tenuispinis (native)
 Amblyceps apangi

Ariidae (Sea catfishes)
 Arius arius (native) Threadfin sea catfish, Threadfin sea catfish
 Arius bilineatus (native), Bronze catfish
 Arius caelatus (native) Engraved catfish, Engraved catfish
 Arius crossocheilos (native), Roughback sea catfish
 Arius dussumieri (native), Blacktip sea catfish
 Arius gagora (native) Gagora catfish, Gagora catfish
 Arius gagorides (native)
 Arius jella (native), Blackfin sea catfish
 Arius macronotacanthus (questionable)
 Arius maculatus (native) Spotted catfish, Spotted catfish
 Arius nenga (native)
 Arius parvipinnis (native)
 Arius platystomus (native), Flatmouth sea catfish
 Arius sagor (native) Sagor catfish, Sagor catfish
 Arius satparanus (native)
 Arius sona (native) Sona sea-catfish, Sona sea catfish
 Arius subrostratus (native), Shovelnose sea catfish
 Arius sumatranus (native), Goat catfish
 Arius tenuispinis (native) Thinspine sea catfish, Thinspine sea catfish
 Arius thalassinus (native), Giant seacatfish
 Arius venosus (native), Veined catfish
 Batrachocephalus mino (native) Frog-headed catfish, Beardless sea catfish
 Hemipimelodus jatius (native) River catfish, River catfish
 Ketengus typus (native), Bigmouth sea catfish
 Osteogeneiosus militaris (native) Soldier catfish, Soldier catfish

Bagridae (Bagrid catfishes)
 Batasio batasio (native) Tista batasio
 Batasio merianiensis (native)
 Batasio sharavatiensis (native)
 Batasio tengana (native) Assamese batasio
 Batasio travancoria (endemic) Malabar batasio
 Hemibagrus maydelli (endemic) Krishna mystus
 Hemibagrus menoda (native) Menoda catfish, Menoda catfish
 Hemibagrus microphthalmus (native) Irrawaddy mystus
 Hemibagrus punctatus (endemic) Nilgiri mystus
 Horabagrus brachysoma (endemic) Günther's catfish, Günther's catfish
 Horabagrus nigricollaris (endemic)
 Mystus armatus (native) Kerala mystus, Kerala mystus
 Mystus bleekeri (native) Day's mystus, Day's mystus
 Mystus canarensis (native)
 Mystus cavasius (native) Gangetic mystus, Gangetic mystus
 Mystus gulio (native) Long-whiskered catfish, Long whiskers catfish
 Mystus keletius (native) Keletius mystus
 Mystus malabaricus (endemic) Jerdon's mystus
 Mystus montanus (endemic) Wynaad mystus
 Mystus oculatus (endemic) Malabar mystus
 Mystus tengara (native) Tengara mystus
 Mystus vittatus (native) Striped dwarf catfish, Striped dwarf catfish
 Pseudobagrus chryseus (native)
 Rama chandramara (native) Asian cory
 Rita chrysea (endemic) Mahanadi rita
 Rita gogra (endemic) Gogra rita
 Rita kuturnee (endemic) Deccan rita
 Rita macracanthus (native)
 Rita rita (native) Rita, Rita
 Sperata aor (native) Long-whiskered catfish, Long-whiskered catfish
 Sperata aorella (native)
 Sperata sarwari (native)
 Sperata seenghala (native) Giant river-catfish, Giant river-catfish

Chacidae (Squarehead or angler catfish)
 Chaca chaca (native) Indian chaca, Squarehead catfish

Clariidae (Airbreathing catfishes)
 Clarias batrachus (native) Magur, Walking catfish
 Clarias dayi (endemic) Malabar clariid
 Clarias dussumieri (endemic) Valenciennes clariid
 Clarias gariepinus (introduced), North African catfish
 Horaglanis alikunhii (native)
 Horaglanis krishnai (endemic) Indian blind catfish, Indian blind catfish

Erethistidae 
 Conta conta (native) Conta catfish, Conta catfish
 Conta pectinata (native)
 Erethistes pusillus (native)
 Erethistoides montana montana (endemic)
 Erethistoides montana pipri (endemic)
 Erethistoides sicula (native)
 Laguvia manipurensis (native)
 Pseudolaguvia foveolata (native)
 Pseudolaguvia kapuri (endemic)
 Pseudolaguvia ribeiroi (native), Painted catfish
 Pseudolaguvia shawi (native)

Heteropneustidae (Airsac catfishes)
 Heteropneustes fossilis (native) Stinging catfish, Stinging catfish
 Heteropneustes longipectoralis (native)
 Heteropneustes microps (native)

Olyridae (Longtail catfishes)
 Olyra burmanica (questionable), Longtail catfish
 Olyra horae (native) Hora olyra
 Olyra kempi (native)
 Olyra longicaudata (native) Himalayan olyra

Pangasiidae (Shark catfishes)
 Pangasius pangasius (native) Pungas, Yellowtail catfish

Plotosidae (Eeltail catfishes)
 Plotosus canius (native) Canine catfish-eel, Gray eel-catfish
 Plotosus limbatus (native) Darkfin eel catfish, Darkfin eel catfish
 Plotosus lineatus (native) Striped eel catfish, Striped eel catfish

Schilbeidae (Schilbid catfishes)
 Ailia coila (native) Gangetic ailia, Gangetic ailia
 Ailia punctata (native) Jamuna ailia, Jamuna ailia
 Clupisoma bastari (endemic) Bastar garua

 Clupisoma garua (native) Guarchcha, Garua Bachcha
 Clupisoma montana (native) Kocha garua
 Clupisoma prateri (questionable) Burmese garua
 Eutropiichthys goongwaree (endemic)
 Eutropiichthys murius (native) Murius vacha
 Eutropiichthys vacha (native) Batchwa vacha
 Neotropius khavalchor (endemic) Khavalchor catfish, Khavalchor catfish
 Proeutropiichthys taakree macropthalmos (questionable) Burmese taakree
 Proeutropiichthys taakree taakree (endemic) Indian taakree
 Pseudeutropius atherinoides (native) Indian potasi, Indian potasi
 Pseudeutropius buchanani (native)
 Pseudeutropius mitchelli (endemic) Malabar patashi
 Silonia childreni (endemic) White catfish
 Silonia silondia (native) Silondia vacha, Silond catfish

Siluridae (Sheatfishes)
 Ompok bimaculatus (native) Indian butter-catfish, Butter catfish
 Ompok goae (native)
 Ompok malabaricus (endemic) Goan catfish, Goan catfish
 Ompok pabda (native) Pabdah catfish, Pabdah catfish
 Ompok pabo (native) Pabo catfish, Pabo catfish
 Pterocryptis afghana (native) Afghanistan silurus
 Pterocryptis berdmorei (questionable) Burmese silurus
 Pterocryptis cochinchinensis (questionable)
 Pterocryptis gangelica (native)
 Pterocryptis indicus (endemic)
 Pterocryptis wynaadensis (endemic) Malabar silurus
 Silurus morehensis (native) Ching ngaten
 Wallago attu (native) Boal, Wallago

Sisoridae (Sisorid catfishes)
 Bagarius bagarius (native) Gangetic goonch, Dwarf goonch
 Bagarius yarrelli (native) Goonch, Goonch
 Euchiloglanis kishinouyei (questionable)
 Exostoma labiatum (native)
 Gagata cenia (native) Indian gagata
 Gagata gagata (native)
 Gagata itchkeea (native) Deccan nangra
 Gagata sexualis (endemic)
 Gagata youssoufi (native)
 Glyptosternon maculatum (native)
 Glyptosternon reticulatum (native), Turkestan catfish
 Glyptothorax annandalei (native)
 Glyptothorax botius (native)
 Glyptothorax brevipinnis (native)
 Glyptothorax cavia (native)
 Glyptothorax coheni (endemic)
 Glyptothorax conirostre (native)
 Glyptothorax davissinghi (native)
 Glyptothorax dorsalis (native)
 Glyptothorax garhwali (endemic)
 Glyptothorax gracilis (native)
 Glyptothorax housei (endemic)
 Glyptothorax indicus (native)
 Glyptothorax kashmirensis (native)
 Glyptothorax lonah (endemic)
 Glyptothorax madraspatanum (endemic)
 Glyptothorax manipurensis 
 Glyptothorax nelsoni (endemic)
 Glyptothorax pectinopterus (native), River cat
 Glyptothorax platypogonides (questionable)
 Glyptothorax poonaensis (endemic)
 Glyptothorax punjabensis (native)
 Glyptothorax saisii (endemic)
 Glyptothorax sinensis (native)
 Glyptothorax stolickae (native)
 Glyptothorax striatus (endemic)
 Glyptothorax telchitta (native)
 Glyptothorax trewavasae (endemic)
 Glyptothorax trilineatus (native), Three-lined catfish
 Glyptothorax ventrolineatus (sp. nov.) Chindwin basin.
 Gogangra viridescens (native) Huddah nangra
 Hara hara (native) Kosi hara
 Hara horai (endemic) Terai hara
 Hara jerdoni (native) Sylhet hara
 Hara serratus (native)
 Myersglanis jayarami (native)
 Nangra assamensis (native)
 Nangra carcharhinoides (native)
 Nangra nangra (native) Kosi nangra
 Nangra robusta (questionable)
 Parachiloglanis hodgarti (native), Torrent catfish
 Pareuchiloglanis kamengensis (native)
 Pareuchiloglanis macrotrema (native)
 Pseudecheneis sulcata (native) Sulcatus catfish, Sucker throat catfish
 Sisor chennuah (native)
 Sisor rabdophorus (native) Sisor catfish
 Sisor rheophilus (native)
 Sisor torosus (native)

Squaliformes

Centrophoridae 
 Centrophorus moluccensis (native), Smallfin gulper shark

Dalatiidae (Sleeper sharks)
 Centroscyllium ornatum (native), Ornate dogfish
 Centroscymnus crepidater (native), Longnose velvet dogfish

Echinorhinidae (Bramble sharks)
 Echinorhinus brucus (native), Bramble shark

Stomiiformes

Gonostomatidae (Bristlemouths)
 Cyclothone microdon (native), Veiled anglemouth
 Cyclothone signata (questionable), Showy bristlemouth
 Gonostoma elongatum (native), Elongated bristlemouth fish

Phosichthyidae (Lightfishes)
 Vinciguerria lucetia (questionable), Panama lightfish

Sternoptychidae 
 Polyipnus spinosus (questionable)

Stomiidae (Barbeled dragonfishes)
 Chauliodus pammelas (native)
 Chauliodus sloani (native), Sloane's viperfish
 Stomias affinis (native), Günther's boafish

Synbranchiformes

Chaudhuriidae 
 Chaudhuria caudata (questionable), Burmese spineless eel
 Garo khajuriai (endemic) Garo spineless eel, Garo spineless eel
 Pillaia indica (endemic) Hillstream spineless eel, Hillstream spineless eel

Mastacembelidae (Spiny eels)
 Macrognathus aculeatus (native), Lesser spiny eel
 Macrognathus aral (native) One-stripe spinyeel, One-stripe spinyeel
 Macrognathus caudiocellatus (questionable)
 Macrognathus guentheri (endemic) Malabar spinyeel, Malabar spinyeel
 Macrognathus malabaricus (native)
 Macrognathus morehensis (native)
 Macrognathus pancalus (native) Striped spinyeel, Barred spiny eel
 Mastacembelus armatus (native) Baam, Zig-zag eel

Synbranchidae (Swamp-eels)
 Monopterus albus (native) Rice swampeel, Swamp eel
 Monopterus cuchia (native) Cuchia, Cuchia
 Monopterus digressus (native)
 Monopterus eapeni (endemic)
 Monopterus fossorius (endemic) Malabar swampeel, Malabar swampeel
 Monopterus hodgarti (endemic) Indian spaghetti-eel, Indian spaghetti-eel
 Monopterus indicus (endemic) Bombay swampeel, Bombay swampeel
 Monopterus roseni (native)
 Ophisternon bengalense (native) Bengal mudeel, Bengal eel

Syngnathiformes

Aulostomidae (Trumpetfishes)
 Aulostomus chinensis (native), Chinese trumpetfish

Centriscidae (Snipefishes and shrimpfishes)
 Centriscus scutatus (native), Grooved razor-fish

Fistulariidae (Cornetfishes)
 Fistularia petimba (native), Red cornetfish

Solenostomidae (Ghost pipefishes)
 Solenostomus cyanopterus (native), Ghost pipefish

Syngnathidae (Pipefishes and seahorses)
 Bhanotia fasciolata (native)
 Choeroichthys brachysoma (native), Short-bodied pipefish
 Choeroichthys sculptus (native), Sculptured pipefish
 Corythoichthys intestinalis (questionable), Scribbled pipefish
 Doryrhamphus excisus excisus (native), Bluestripe pipefish
 Hippichthys cyanospilos (native), Blue-spotted pipefish
 Hippichthys heptagonus (native), Belly pipefish
 Hippichthys penicillus (native), Beady pipefish
 Hippichthys spicifer (native) Bellybarred pipefish, Bellybarred pipefish
 Hippocampus fuscus (questionable) Chilka seahorse, Sea pony
 Hippocampus histrix (native), Thorny seahorse
 Hippocampus kelloggi (native), Great seahorse
 Hippocampus kuda (native), Spotted seahorse
 Hippocampus trimaculatus (native), Longnose seahorse
 Ichthyocampus carce (native) Freshwater pipefish, Freshwater pipefish
 Microphis brachyurus brachyurus (native) Short-tailed pipefish, Short-tailed pipefish
 Microphis cuncalus (native) Crocodile-tooth pipefish, Crocodile-tooth pipefish
 Microphis deocata (native) Deocata pipefish, Deocata pipefish
 Microphis insularis (native) Andaman pipefish, Andaman pipefish
 Phoxocampus belcheri (native), Rock pipefish
 Syngnathoides biaculeatus (native), Alligator pipefish
 Trachyrhamphus serratus (native)

Tetraodontiformes

Balistidae (Triggerfishes)

 Abalistes stellaris (native), Starry triggerfish, fish
 Balistapus undulatus (native), Orange-lined triggerfish
 Balistes ellioti (native)
 Balistes rotundatus (native)
 Balistes vetula (questionable), Queen triggerfish
 Balistoides conspicillum (native), Clown triggerfish
 Balistoides viridescens (native), Titan triggerfish
 Melichthys niger (native), Black triggerfish
 Odonus niger (native), Redtoothed triggerfish
 Pseudobalistes flavimarginatus (native), Yellowmargin triggerfish
 Pseudobalistes fuscus (native), Yellow-spotted triggerfish
 Rhinecanthus aculeatus (native), Blackbar triggerfish
 Rhinecanthus rectangulus (native), Wedge-tail triggerfish
 Sufflamen chrysopterum (native), Halfmoon triggerfish
 Sufflamen fraenatum (native), Masked triggerfish

Diodontidae (Porcupinefishes (burrfishes))
 Cyclichthys orbicularis (native), Birdbeak burrfish
 Cyclichthys spilostylus (native), Spotbase burrfish
 Diodon holocanthus (native) Bloched porcupine fish, Long-spine porcupinefish
 Diodon hystrix (native) Spotted porcupine fish, Spot-fin porcupinefish
 Lophodiodon calori (native), Four-bar porcupinefish

Molidae (Molas or Ocean Sunfishes)
 Mola mola (native), Ocean sunfish

Monacanthidae (Filefishes)
 Acreichthys tomentosus (native), Bristle-tail file-fish
 Aluterus monoceros (native), Unicorn leatherjacket
 Aluterus scriptus (native), Scrawled filefish
 Anacanthus barbatus (native), Bearded leatherjacket
 Cantherhines sandwichiensis (questionable), Sandwich isle file
 Lalmohania velutina (native)
 Oxymonacanthus longirostris (native), Harlequin filefish
 Paraluteres prionurus (native), Blacksaddle filefish
 Paramonacanthus choirocephalus (questionable) Pig faced leather jacket, Pig faced leather jacket
 Paramonacanthus japonicus (native), Hairfinned leatherjacket
 Paramonacanthus oblongus (native), Hair-finned filefish
 Paramonacanthus tricuspis (native)
 Thamnaconus modestoides (native), Modest filefish

Ostraciidae (Boxfishes)
 Lactoria cornuta (native), Longhorn cowfish
 Ostracion cubicus (native), Yellow boxfish
 Ostracion meleagris (native), Whitespotted boxfish
 Ostracion nasus (native), Shortnose boxfish
 Tetrosomus gibbosus (native), Humpback turretfish

Tetraodontidae (Puffers)
 Arothron hispidus (native) White spotted blow fish, White-spotted puffer
 Arothron immaculatus (native) Immaculate blow fish, Immaculate puffer
 Arothron leopardus (native) Banded leopardblowfish, Banded leopardblowfish
 Arothron meleagris (native), Guineafowl puffer
 Arothron nigropunctatus (native) Black spotted blow fish, Blackspotted puffer
 Arothron reticularis (native) Reticulated blowfish, Reticulated pufferfish
 Arothron stellatus (native) Star blaasop, Starry toadfish
 Canthigaster amboinensis (native), Spider-eye puffer
 Canthigaster bennetti (native), Bennett's sharpnose puffer
 Canthigaster coronata (native), Crowned puffer
 Canthigaster margaritata (native)
 Carinotetraodon imitator (endemic)
 Carinotetraodon travancoricus (endemic) Malabar pufferfish, Malabar pufferfish
 Chelonodon patoca (native) Gangetic pufferfish, Milkspotted puffer
 Lagocephalus guentheri (native), Diamondback puffer
 Lagocephalus inermis (native) Smooth-backed blowfish, Smooth blaasop
 Lagocephalus lagocephalus lagocephalus (native), Oceanic puffer
 Lagocephalus lunaris (native) Moontail blaasop, Green rough-backed puffer
 Lagocephalus spadiceus (native) Chinese blaasop, Half-smooth golden pufferfish
 Takifugu oblongus (native) Lattice blaasop, Lattice blaasop
 Tetraodon cutcutia (native) Ocellated pufferfish, Ocellated pufferfish
 Tetraodon fluviatilis (native) Green pufferfish, Green pufferfish
 Tetraodon nigroviridis (native) Burmese pufferfish, Spotted green pufferfish
 Torquigener hypselogeneion (native), Orange-spotted toadfish
 Tylerius spinosissimus (native), Spiny blaasop

Triacanthidae (Triplespines)
 Pseudotriacanthus strigilifer (native) Long spined tripod fish, Long-spined tripodfish
 Triacanthus biaculeatus (native) Short-nosed tripodfish, Short-nosed tripodfish
 Triacanthus nieuhofii (native), Silver tripodfish
 Tripodichthys oxycephalus (native), Short-tail tripodfish

Triacanthodidae (Spikefishes)
 Macrorhamphosodes platycheilus (native), Trumpetsnout spikefish
 Triacanthodes ethiops (native), Shortsnout spikefish

Torpediniformes

Narcinidae (Numbfishes)
 Benthobatis moresbyi (native), Dark blind ray
 Heteronarce prabhui (native), Quilon electric ray
 Narcine brunnea (native), Brown numbfish
 Narcine indica (questionable), Largespotted numbfish
 Narcine lingula (native), Chinese numbfish
 Narcine prodorsalis (questionable), Tonkin numbfish
 Narcine timlei (native), Blackspotted numbfish
 Narke dipterygia (native), Spottail sleeper ray

Torpedinidae (Electric rays)
 Torpedo fuscomaculata (questionable), Black-spotted torpedo
 Torpedo panthera (native), Panther electric ray
 Torpedo sinuspersici (native), Marbled electric ray

Zeiformes

Caproidae (Boarfishes)
 Antigonia indica (native)
 Antigonia rubescens (questionable), Indo-Pacific boarfish

Parazenidae (Parazen)
 Cyttopsis rosea (native), Rosy dory

Zeidae (Dories)
 Zenopsis conchifera (native), Silvery John dory
 Zenopsis nebulosa (native), Mirror dory

See also
 Indian carp
 List of fishes of Pune district
 Wildlife of India

References

India